= 2014 Pacific hurricane season =

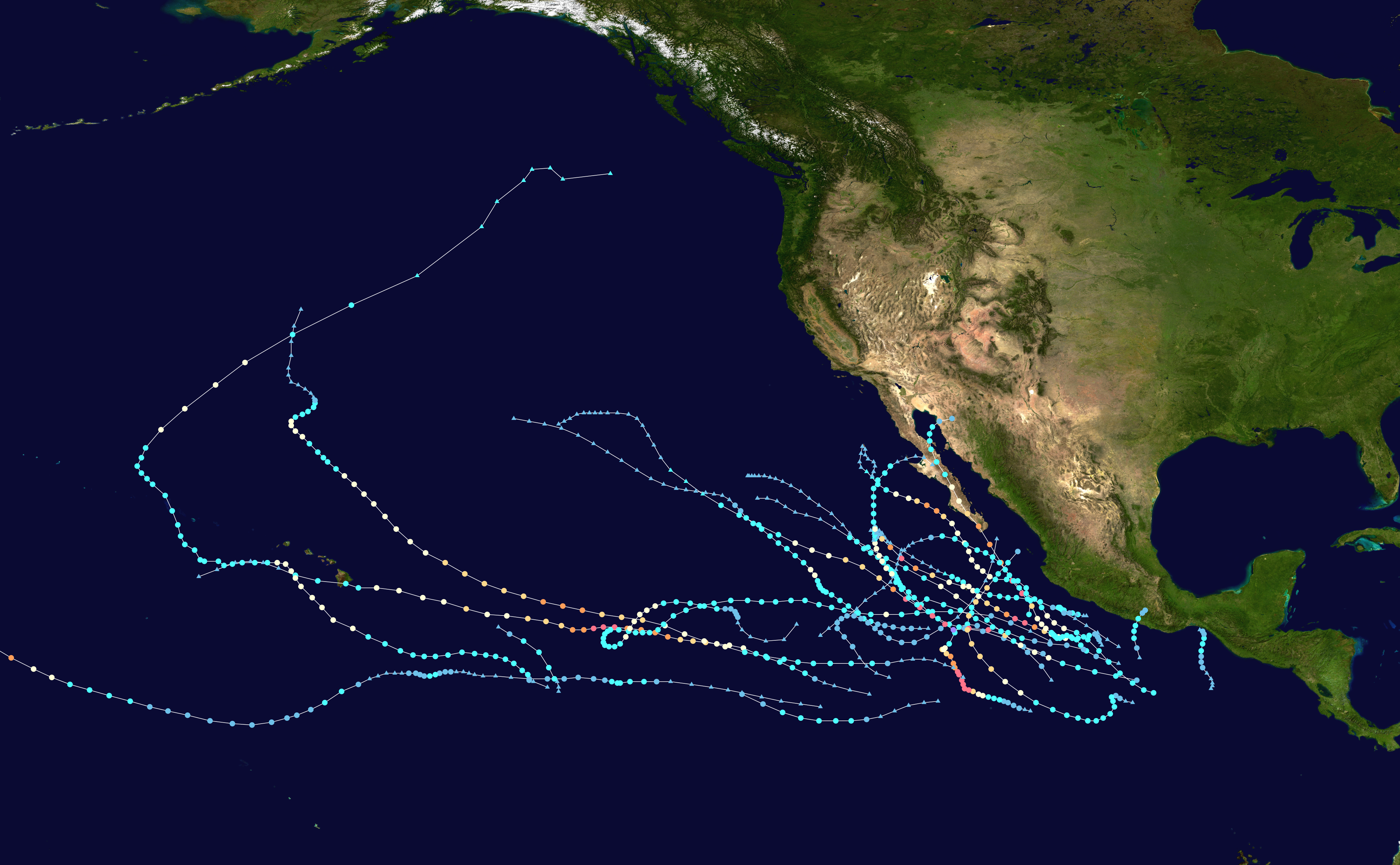
- Season summary map

Seasonal boundaries
- First system formed: May 22, 2014
- Last system dissipated: November 5, 2014

Strongest storm
- Name: Marie
  - Maximum winds: 160 mph (260 km/h) (1-minute sustained)
  - Lowest pressure: 918 mbar (hPa; 27.11 inHg)

Seasonal statistics
- Total depressions: 23
- Total storms: 22
- Hurricanes: 16 (record high, tied with 1990, 1992 and 2015)
- Major hurricanes (Cat. 3+): 9
- ACE: 202.4
- Total fatalities: 50 total
- Total damage: ≥ $2.09 billion (2014 USD) (Fifth-costliest Pacific hurricane season on record)

Related articles
- Timeline of the 2014 Pacific hurricane season; 2014 Atlantic hurricane season; 2014 Pacific typhoon season; 2014 North Indian Ocean cyclone season

The 2014 Pacific hurricane season was one of the busiest and costliest Pacific hurricane seasons since the keeping of reliable records began in 1949. The season officially started on May 15 in the East Pacific Ocean, and on June 1 in the Central Pacific; they both ended on November 30. These dates conventionally delimit the period of each year when most tropical cyclones form in these regions of the Pacific.

Entering the season, expectations of tropical activity were high, with most weather agencies predicting a near or above average season. The season began with an active start, with three tropical cyclones developing before June 15, including two Category 4 hurricanes, of which one became the strongest tropical cyclone ever recorded in May in the East Pacific. After a less active period in late June and early July, activity once again picked up in late July. Activity increased in August, which featured four major hurricanes, and persisted throughout September and October. However, activity finally waned by early November. Overall, the 22 tropical storms marked the highest total in 22 years. In addition, a record-tying 16 hurricanes developed. Furthermore, there were total of nine major hurricanes, Category 3 or greater on the Saffir–Simpson hurricane wind scale, including a then-record-tying eight in Eastern Pacific proper (east of 140°W).

The active season resulted in numerous records and highlights. First, Hurricane Amanda was the strongest May hurricane and earliest Category 4 on record. A month later, Hurricane Cristina became the earliest second major hurricane, although it was surpassed by Hurricane Blanca the following year. In August, Hurricane Iselle became the strongest tropical cyclone on record to strike the Big Island of Hawaii while Hurricane Marie was the first Category 5 hurricane since 2010. The following month, Hurricane Odile became the most destructive tropical cyclone of the season and the most intense and destructive tropical cyclone to make landfall over the Baja California peninsula.

== Seasonal forecasts ==
| Record | | Named storms | Hurricanes | Major hurricanes | Ref |
|---|---|---|---|---|---|
| Average (1981–2010): | | 15.4 | 7.6 | 3.2 | |
| Record high activity: | | 1992: 27 | 2015: 16 | 2015: 11 | |
| Record low activity: | | 2010: 8 | 2010: 3 | 2003: 0 | |
| Date | Source | Named storms | Hurricanes | Major hurricanes | Ref |
| March 12, 2014 | SMN | 15 | 7 | 3 | |
| April 10, 2014 | SMN | 14 | 7 | 5 | |
| May 22, 2014 | CPC | 14–20 | 7–11 | 3–6 | |
| July 31, 2014 | SMN | 17 | 8 | 5 | |
| | Area | Named storms | Hurricanes | Major hurricanes | Ref |
| Actual activity: | EPAC | 20 | 15 | 9 | |
| Actual activity: | CPAC | 2 | 1 | 0 | |
| Actual activity: | | 22 | 16 | 9 | |

On March 12, 2014, the Servicio Meteorológico Nacional (SMN) issued its first outlook for the Pacific hurricane season, expecting a total of fifteen named storms, seven hurricanes, and three major hurricanes (Note: A major hurricane is a storm that ranks as Category 3 or higher on the Saffir–Simpson hurricane wind scale.). A month later, the agency revised their outlook to fourteen named storms, seven hurricanes, and five major hurricanes, citing the anticipated development of El Niño for above-average activity, compared to the 1949–2013 average of 13.2, On May 22, the Climate Prediction Center (CPC) announced its prediction of 14 to 20 named storms, seven to eleven hurricanes, three to six major hurricanes, and an accumulated cyclone energy (ACE) within 95–160% of the median. It also called for a 50% chance of an above-normal season, a 40% chance of a near-normal season, and a 10% chance of a below-normal season. Similar to the SMN outlook, the basis for the forecast was the expectation of below average wind shear and above average sea surface temperatures, both factors associated with El Niño conditions. The CPC also noted that the Eastern Pacific was in a lull that first began in 1995; however, they expected that this would be offset by the aforementioned favorable conditions. Within the Central Pacific Hurricane Center (CPHC)'s jurisdiction, four to seven tropical cyclones were expected to form, slightly above the average of four to five tropical cyclones. On July 31, the SMN released their final forecast, raising the numbers to 17 named storms, 8 hurricanes and 5 major hurricanes.

== Seasonal summary ==
List of costliest Pacific hurricane seasons
| Rank | Cost | Season |
|---|---|---|
| 1 | ≥$13.1 billion | 2023 |
| 2 | $4.47 billion | 2013 |
| 3 | ≥$3.15 billion | 1992 |
| 4 | $2.46 billion | 2024 |
| 5 | ≥$2.09 billion | 2014 |
| 6 | ≥$1.64 billion | 2018 |
| 7 | $1.62 billion | 2010 |
| 8 | $1.31 billion | 1982 |
| 10 | $918.15 million | 2026 |
| 10 | $850 million | 1998 |

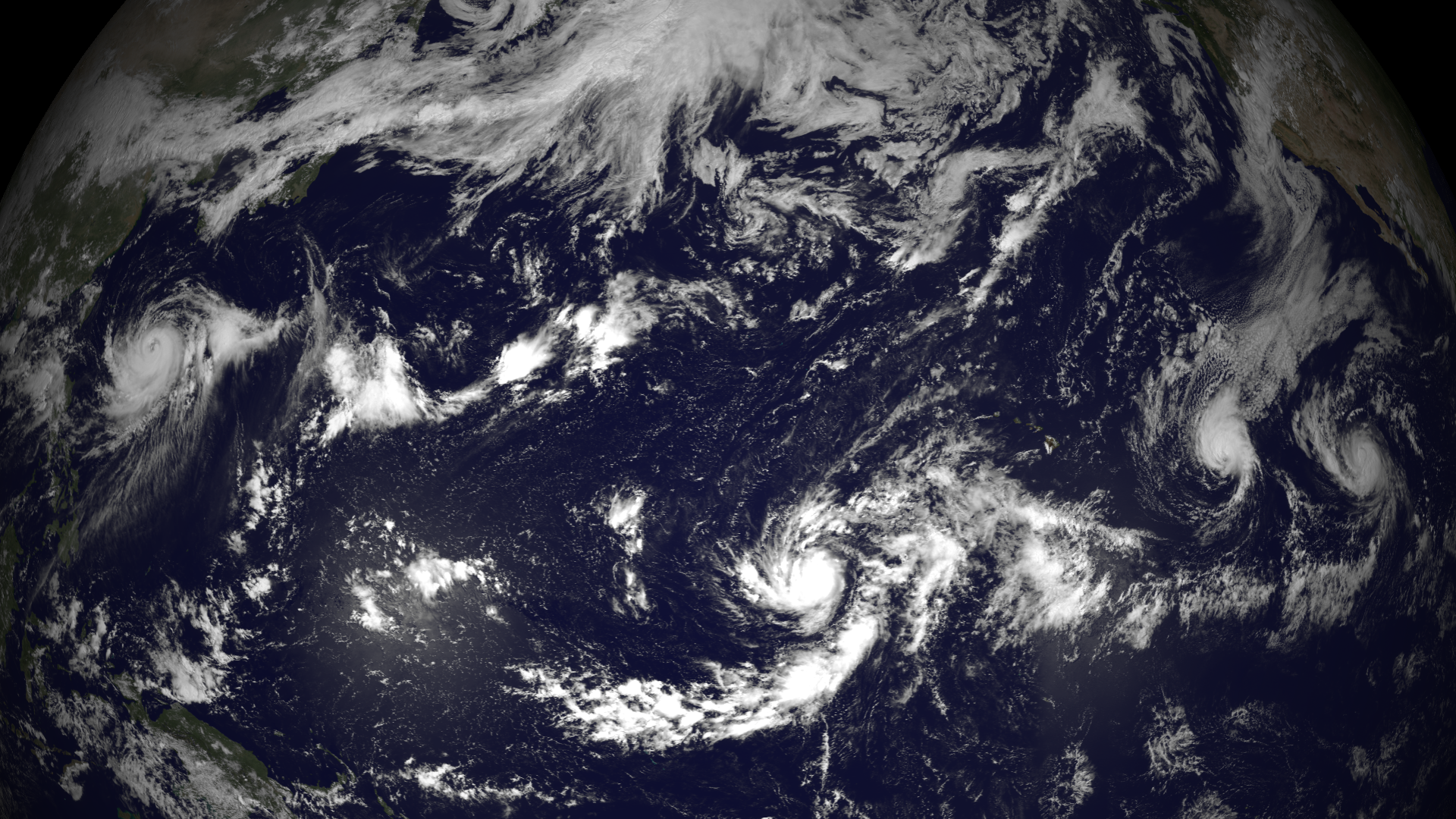
A train of four storms in the northern Pacific on August 6; shown from left to right are Typhoon Halong, Hurricane Genevieve, Hurricane Iselle, and Hurricane Julio

The Accumulated Cyclone Energy (ACE) index for the 2014 Pacific hurricane season (Eastern Pacific and Central Pacific combined) as calculated by Colorado State University using data from the National Hurricane Center was 202.4 units. (Note: The total represents the sum of the squares of the maximum sustained wind speed (knots) for every (sub)tropical storm's intensity of over 33 knots (38 mph; 61 km/h), divided by 10,000 while they are above that threshold; therefore, tropical depressions are not included.) Broadly speaking, ACE is a measure of the power of a tropical or subtropical storm multiplied by the length of time it existed. It is only calculated for full advisories on specific tropical and subtropical systems reaching or exceeding wind speeds of 39 miles per hour (63 km/h). The total ACE for the East Pacific was 43% above the 1981–2010 average and ranked as the seventh-highest since 1971.

The season's first named storm, Amanda, developed on May 23, shortly after the official start to the Pacific hurricane season on May 15. On May 24, the system intensified into a hurricane, transcending the climatological average date of June 26 for the first hurricane. The next day, Amanda attained major hurricane status, over a month sooner than the average date of July 19. Owing to Amanda's extreme intensity the ACE value for May was the highest on record in the East Pacific at 18.6 units, eclipsing the previous record of 17.9 units set in 2001. Hurricane Cristina became the second's major hurricane, the system broke the previous record set by Hurricane Darby in 2010 which reached major status on June 25. However, this record was broken by Hurricane Blanca in 2015 which reached major status on June 3. Through June 14, the seasonal ACE reached its highest level since 1971, when reliable records began, for so early in the season. By the end of June, the ACE total remained at 230% of the normal value, before subsiding to near-average levels to end July. By late July, the basin became rejuvenated, with 3 systems forming during the final 10 days of the month. Activity in August ramped up significantly, with four hurricanes developing during the month, two of which became major hurricanes, excluding Iselle and Genevieve, which formed in July, but became a major hurricane during August. By the end of August, ACE values rose to 60% above the 30-year average.

Continued, though less prolific, activity extended through September with four hurricanes developing that month. ACE values remained 45% above-average by the end of the month. Following the rapid intensification of Hurricane Simon to a Category 3 hurricane during the afternoon of October 4, the 2014 season featured the highest number of major hurricanes in the Eastern Pacific basin since the advent of satellite imagery. With eight such storms east of 140°W, the year tied with the record set in the 1992 season. However, this record was surpassed by the 2015 Pacific hurricane season.

== Systems ==
=== Hurricane Amanda ===
- Category 4 hurricane (SSHWS)
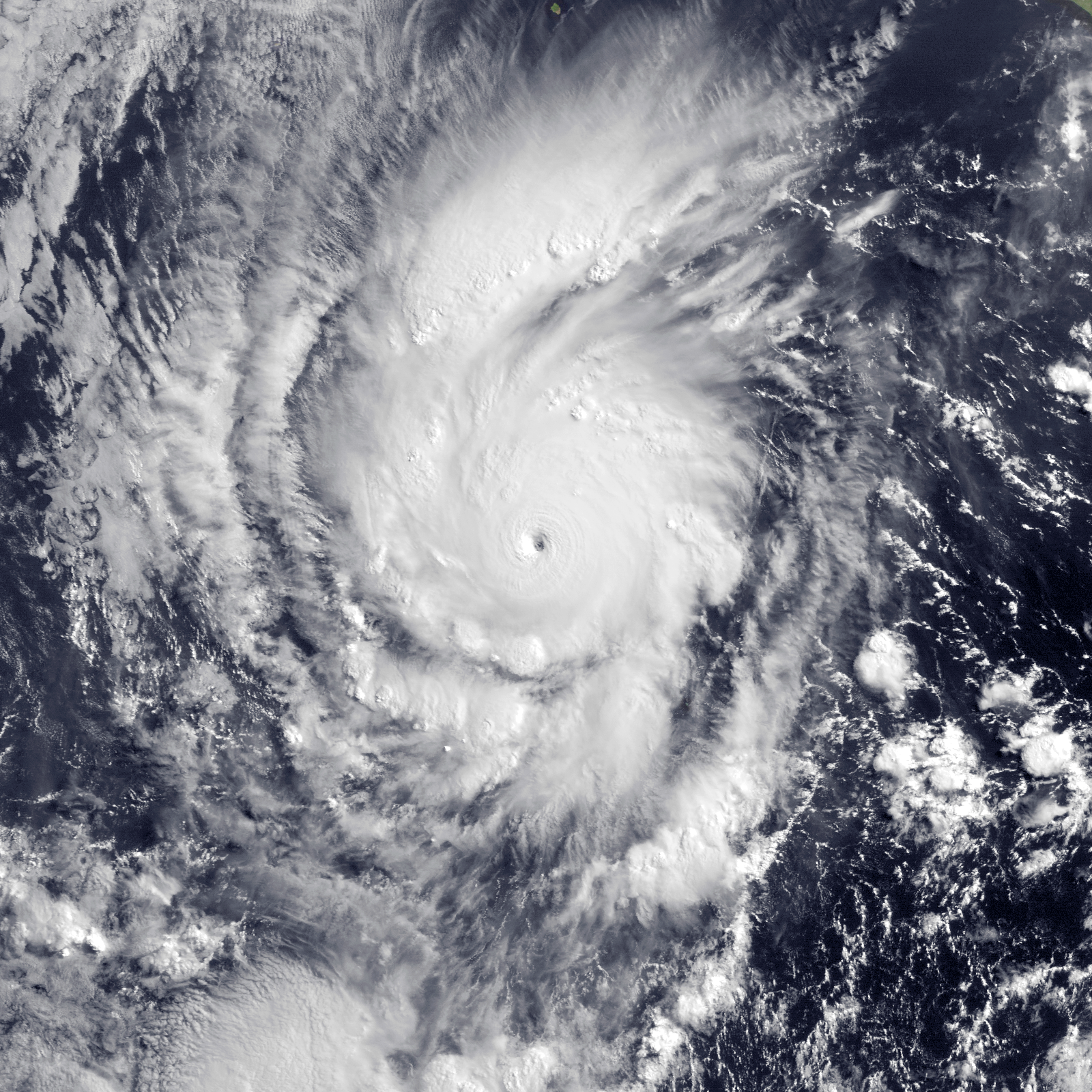
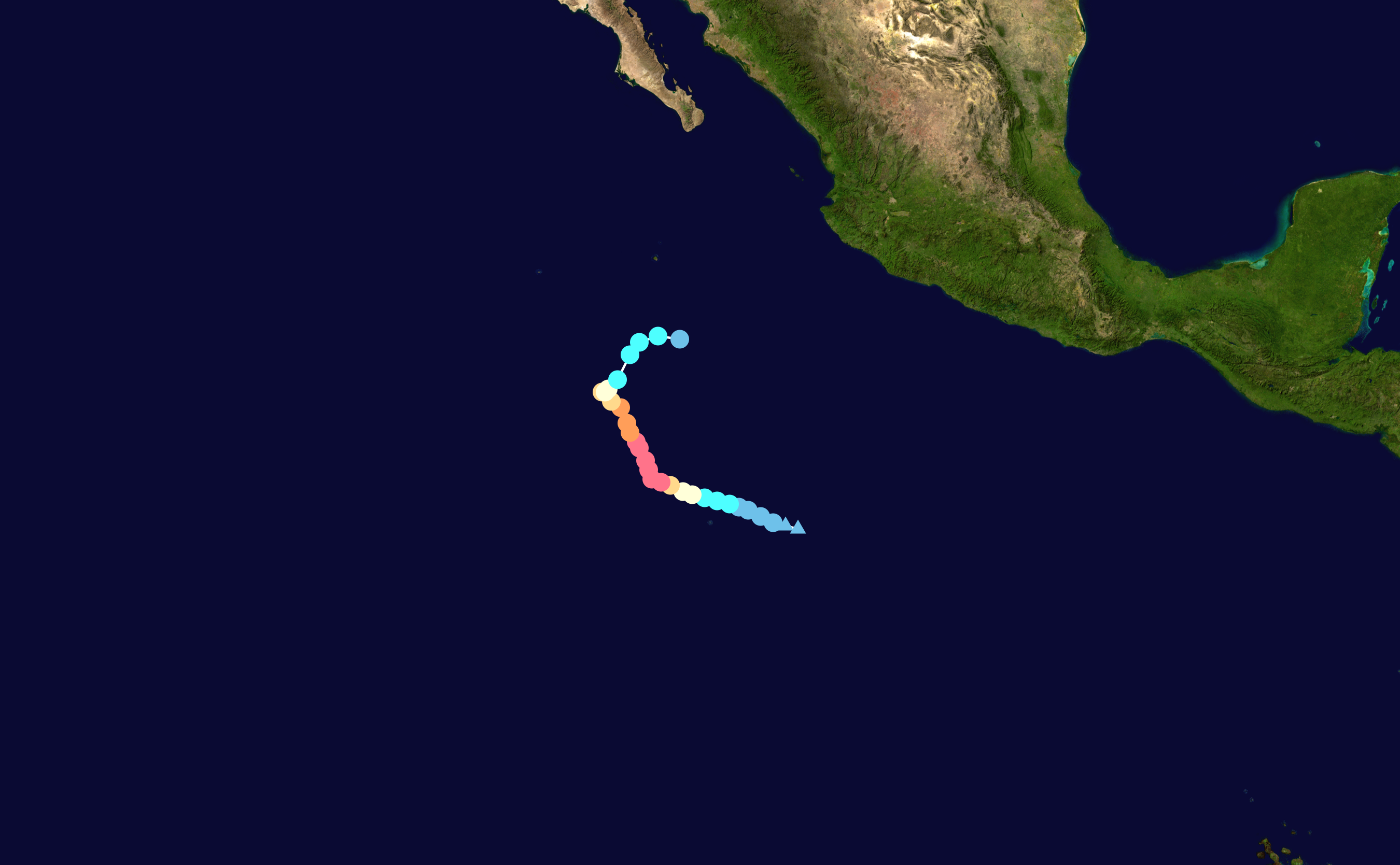
- Duration: May 22 – May 29
- Peak intensity: 155 mph (250 km/h) (1-min); 932 mbar (hPa)

On May 16, a tropical wave emerged into the Eastern Pacific. Moving westward, the wave changed little in organization until May 19, when a broad surface low formed about 500 mi (805 km) south of Acapulco. The system failed to organize further over the next two days as thunderstorm activity oscillated as it continued to track westward and eventually west-northwestward. By May 22, however, scatterometer data began to indicate that the system was becoming better defined, with deep convection persisting near the center, which was getting better organized. Based on this data, the National Hurricane Center upgraded the disturbance to Tropical Depression One-E at 18:00 UTC that day while located about 550 miles (890 km) south-southwest of Manzanillo, Mexico, although it was not operationally classified until three hours later. The depression gradually organized, with banding features developing near the center, and eventually was upgraded to a tropical storm on May 23, being assigned the name Amanda. Steered by a subtropical ridge over central Mexico, Amanda slowly moved westward against the southern periphery of the ridge. With very warm sea surface temperatures of near 30 °C (86 °F), a moist environment, and light wind shear, forecasters at the National Hurricane Center predicted that Amanda had the potential to rapidly intensify. Indeed, Amanda then began a period of rapid intensification late on May 23, becoming a hurricane by 15:00 UTC on May 24. Banding features and a central dense overcast (CDO) continued to become better organized, and a pinhole eye was seen to develop in microwave imagery. The small eye of the cyclone continued to quickly clear, and Amanda became a major hurricane by 03:00 UTC on May 25, making it the second-earliest such storm within the National Hurricane Center's area of responsibility, only to be surpassed by Hurricane Bud from 2012. The rapid intensification eventually leveled off with Amanda reaching its peak intensity at 12:00 UTC that day as a high-end Category 4 hurricane on the Saffir–Simpson scale. Winds were estimated at 155 mph (250 km/h) and the minimum pressure at 932 mbar (hPa; 27.52 inHg).

Because Amanda had been moving slowly over nearly the same areas as it had before, the hurricane began upwelling waters from below, with sea surface temperatures dropping by 6 °C underneath it. Amanda maintained its peak intensity for 6 hours before it began to steadily weaken due to the upwelled waters. However, a more rapid phase of weakening began due to increasing wind shear and decreasing sea surface temperatures of less than 24 °C (75 °F). By May 27, Amanda had fallen below major hurricane intensity, and despite slightly redeveloping its CDO, Amanda continued to rapidly weaken due to dry air, degrading to a tropical storm on May 28. The circulation then became elongated, and Amanda later dissipated the next day.

Heavy rains occurred in Guerrero, resulting in flooding. A river near Coyuca de Benítez overflowed its banks. Three trees were brought down and a vehicle in Acapulco was destroyed. Statewide, one person was killed when a tree that had fallen on the road resulted in a fatal car wreck. In Colima, minor landslides occurred, resulting in the closure of Federal Highway 200. Much of Michoacán was battered by large waves and heavy rains, resulting in two casualties. Several roads were destroyed in Zitácuaro. The 2014 15U Baseball World Cup had to be relocated from La Paz, Baja California Sur to Sinaloa due to damage caused by the storm.

=== Tropical Storm Boris ===
- Tropical storm (SSHWS)
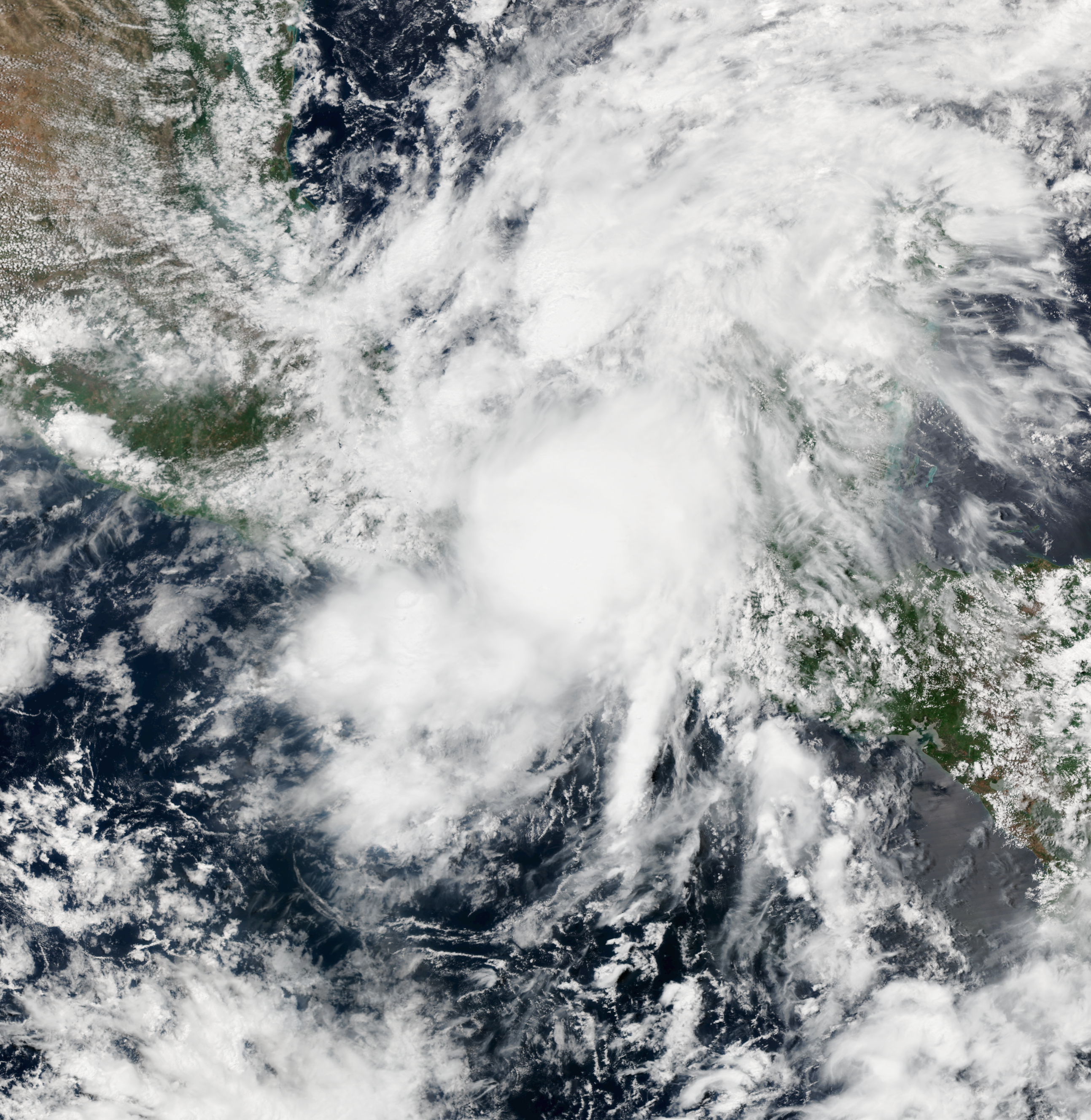
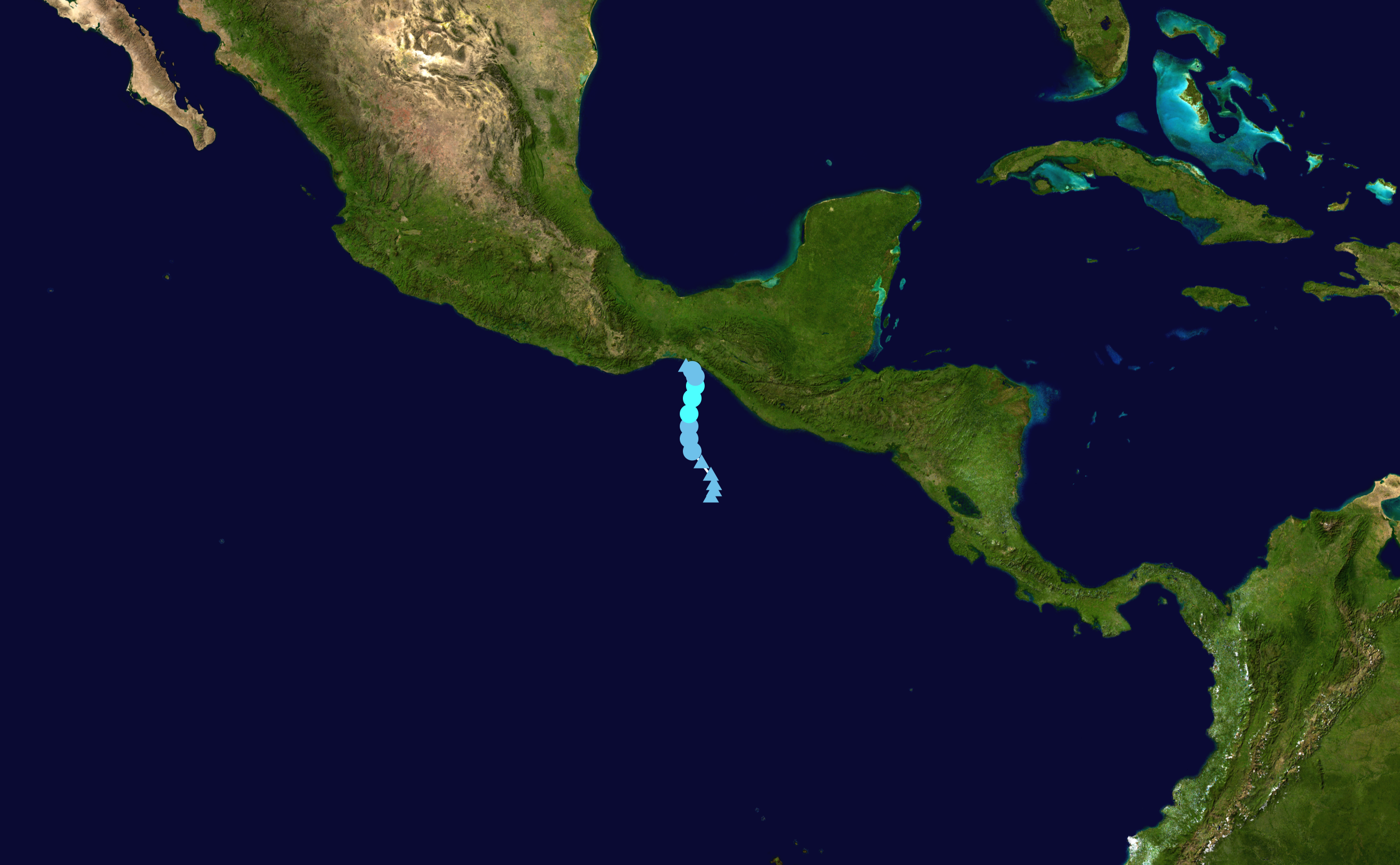
- Duration: June 2 – June 4
- Peak intensity: 45 mph (75 km/h) (1-min); 998 mbar (hPa)

The formation of Boris is attributed to a low-level trough that entered the East Pacific from the southwestern Caribbean Sea on May 28. A broad area of low pressure developed in association with the trough south of the Mexico–Guatemala border two days later, and the disturbance steadily organized with aid from an eastward-moving convectively-coupled kelvin wave. By 18:00 UTC on June 2, the system acquired enough organization to be deemed a tropical depression. Tracking northward, the depression steadily became better defined as spiral bands developed over the eastern semicircle of the circulation. After intensifying into a tropical storm at 12:00 UTC on June 3 and attaining peak winds of 45 mph (70 km/h) six hours later, increasing land interaction caused Boris to begin weakening. It was downgraded to a tropical storm early on June 4 and subsequently degenerated into a remnant low at 18:00 UTC. The remnant low turned northwestward and dissipated shortly thereafter.

Posing a considerable rainfall and mudslide threat to Guatemala, classes were suspended in nine school districts, impacting 1.25 million pupils. Similarly, some classes were suspended in the Mexican states of Chiapas and Oaxaca. In the former, roughly 16,000 people were evacuated out of hazardous areas. Most of the impacts associated with Boris were due to its developing precursor, whose heavy rainfalls caused 20 mudslides, killing five and resulting in extensive property damage. Heavy rainfall in Chiapas caused rivers to overflow their banks, resulting in minor damage. Overall, the effects of Tropical Storm Boris and its precursor killed six people across Central America.

=== Hurricane Cristina ===
- Category 4 hurricane (SSHWS)
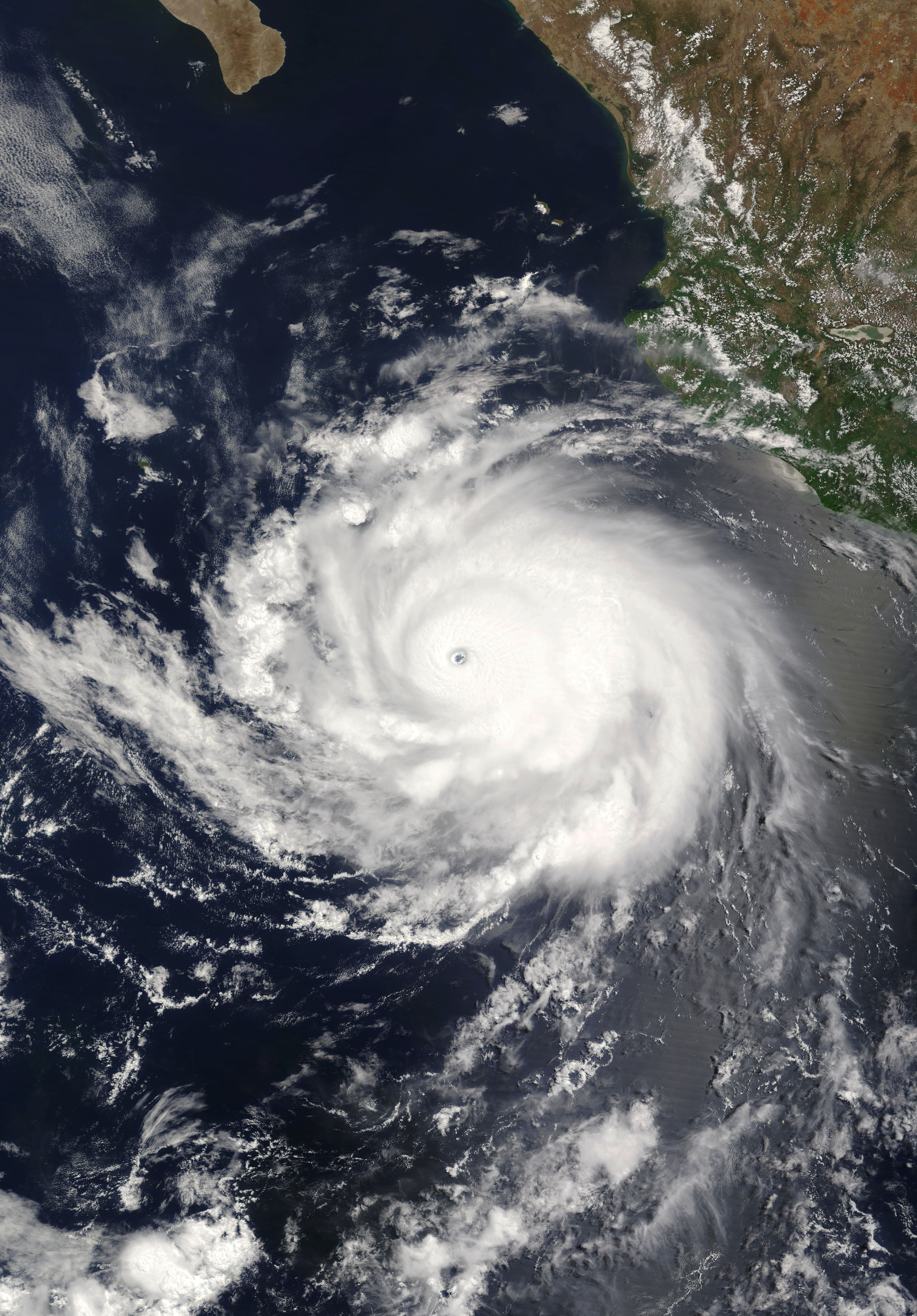
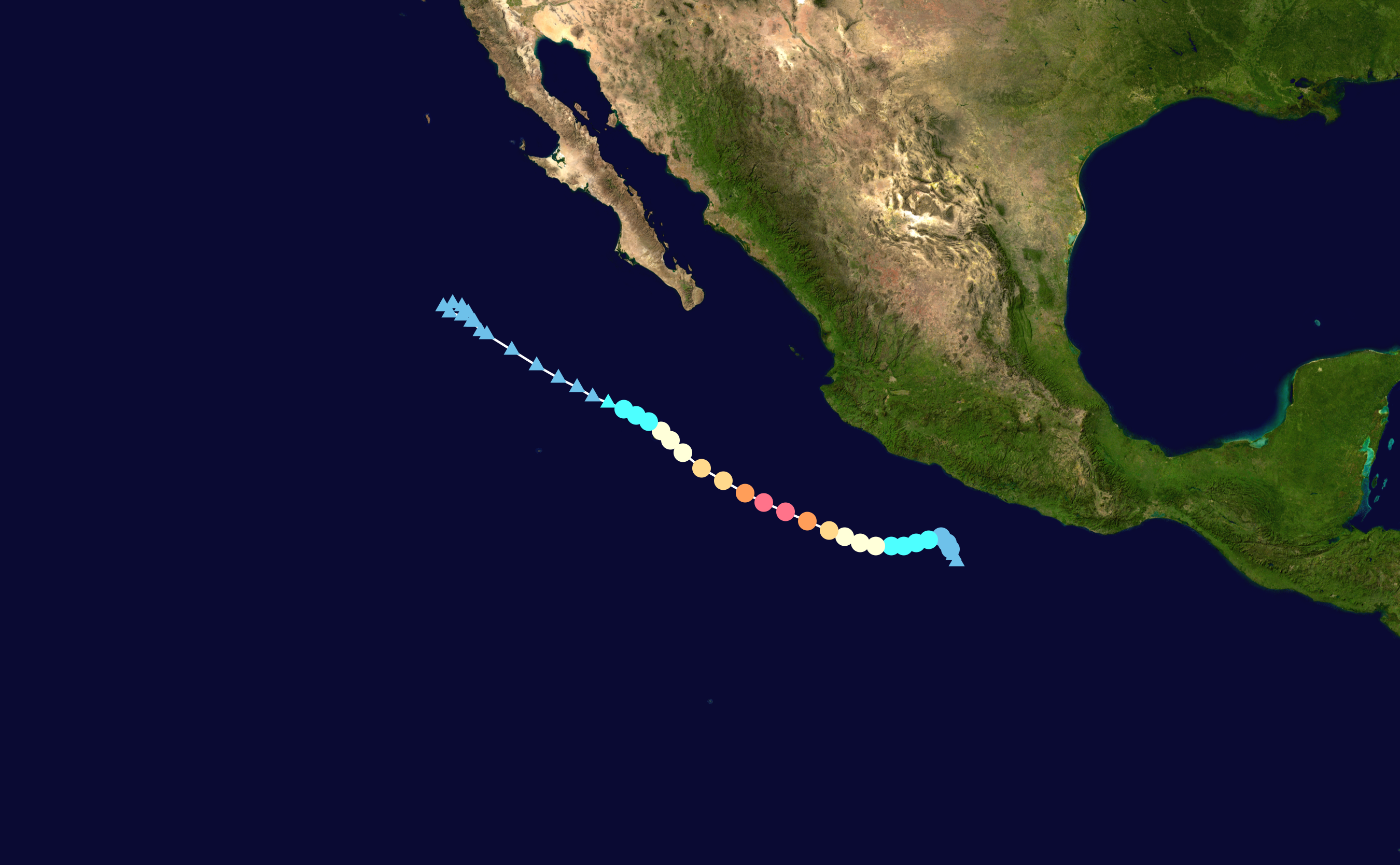
- Duration: June 9 – June 15
- Peak intensity: 150 mph (240 km/h) (1-min); 935 mbar (hPa)

The complex interaction of a tropical wave, disturbance within the Intertropical Convergence Zone, and convectively-coupled kelvin wave led to the formation of a tropical depression around 12:00 UTC on June 9. Northerly shear limited intensification of the cyclone initially, but it became Tropical Storm Cristina eighteen hours after formation. A relaxation in upper-level winds allowed the system to begin a period of rapid intensification on June 11, and Cristina became both the earliest second hurricane and major hurricane on record at the time before attaining its peak as a Category 4 with winds of 150 mph (240 km/h) around 12:00 UTC on June 12. The combination of an eyewall replacement cycle, cooler waters, and entrainment of dry air caused Cristina to begin weakening shortly after peak; it fell to tropical storm intensity early on June 14 and degenerated to a remnant low by 06:00 UTC the next morning. The low moved erratically within low-level flow and dissipated early on June 19.

Under the anticipation of 12 ft (3.7 m) waves, a "yellow" alert was issued for Colima, Guerrero, Oaxaca, and parts of Jalisco and Michoacán. Along Manzanillo, strong waves resulted in minor flooding that damaged one road.

=== Tropical Storm Douglas ===
- Tropical storm (SSHWS)
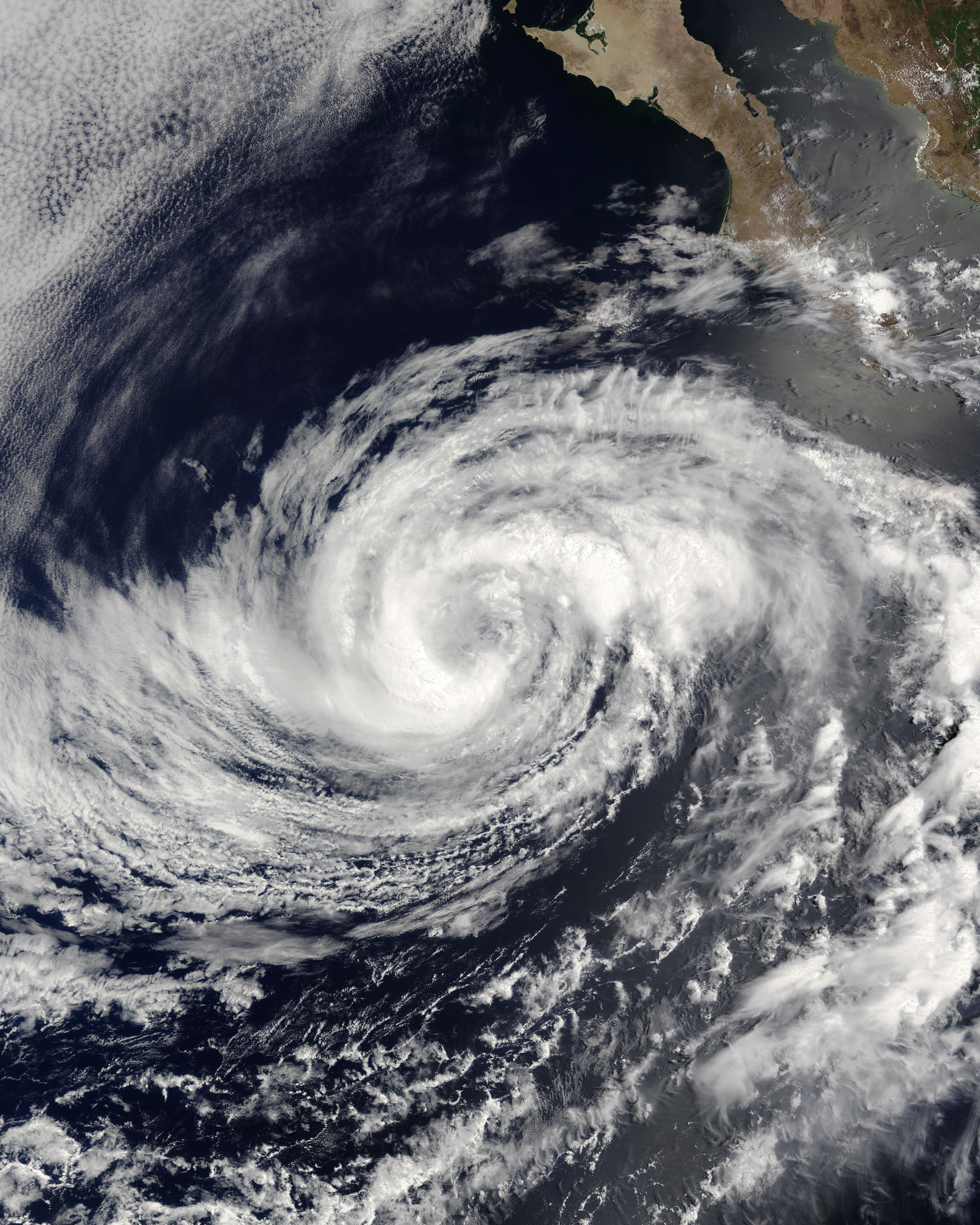
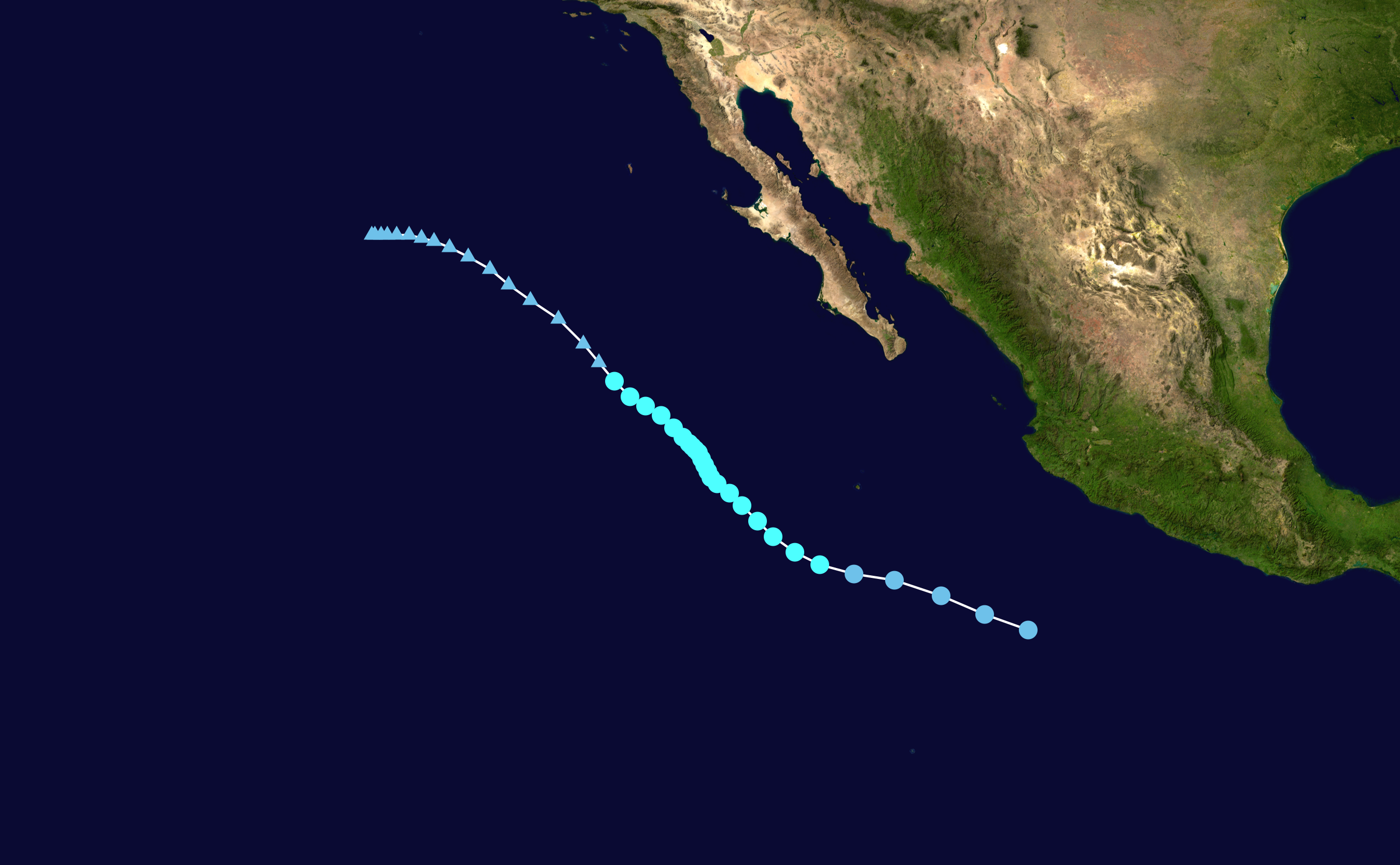
- Duration: June 28 – July 5
- Peak intensity: 50 mph (85 km/h) (1-min); 999 mbar (hPa)

A tropical wave emerged off the western coast of Africa on June 17, tracking across the Atlantic Ocean with inappreciable organization throughout the following days. The wave crossed Central America on June 25, where deep convective activity increased. On June 28, the disturbance became distinctively better defined with a well-defined center and spiral banding, signifying the formation of a tropical depression by 18:00 UTC while positioned about 345 mi (555 km) south-southwest of Manzanillo, Mexico. Steered west-northwest and eventually northwest under the influence of a mid-level ridge, the broad cyclone slowly intensified into a tropical storm by 00:00 UTC on June 30, attaining peak winds of 50 mph (80 km/h) late the next day. Thereafter, a track over cooler waters and into a drier environment caused the system to begin weakening; at 06:00 UTC on July 5, Douglas degenerated into a non-convective remnant low well west of Baja California. The remnant low turned slowly west-northwest prior to dissipating on July 8.

=== Tropical Storm Elida ===
- Tropical storm (SSHWS)
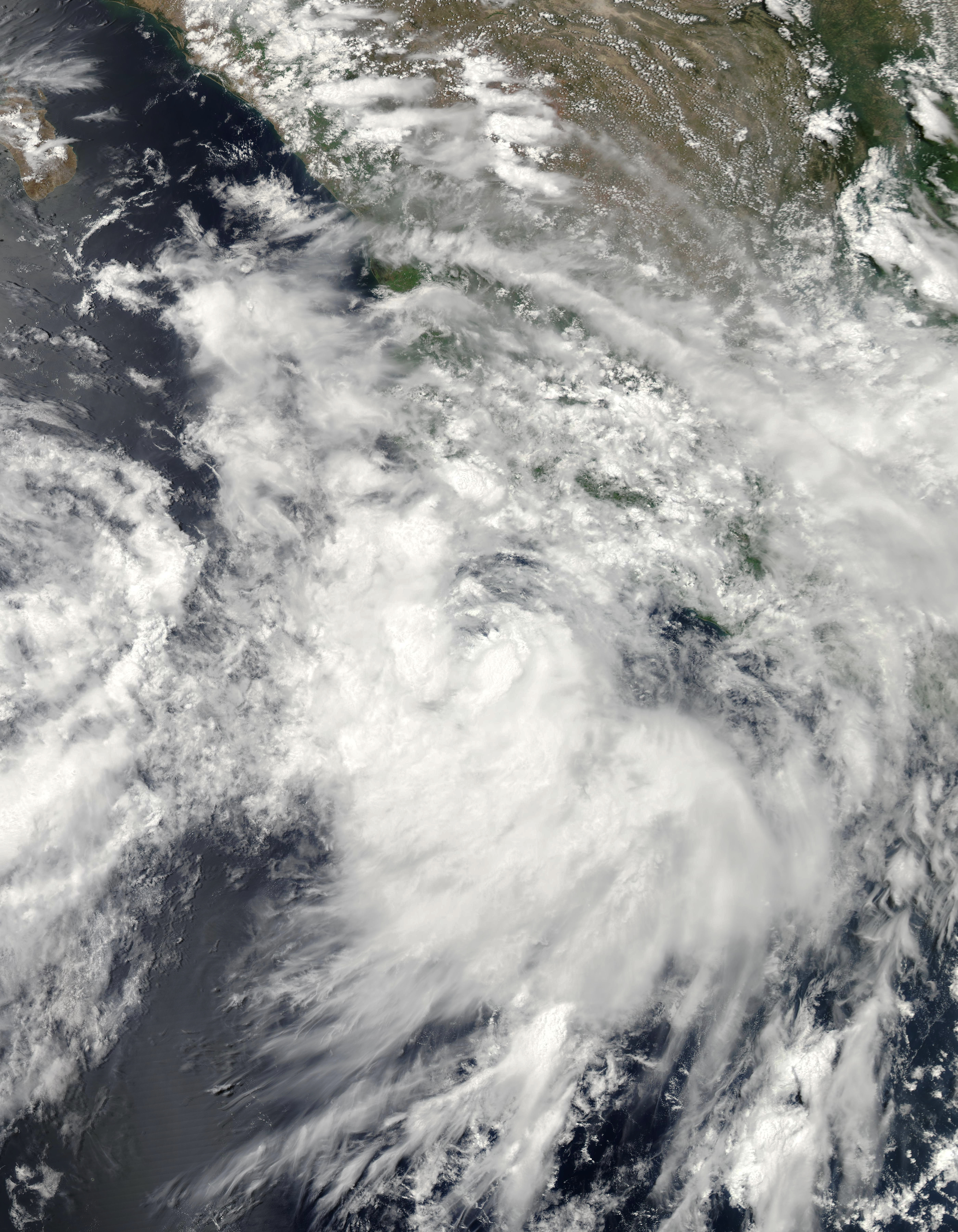
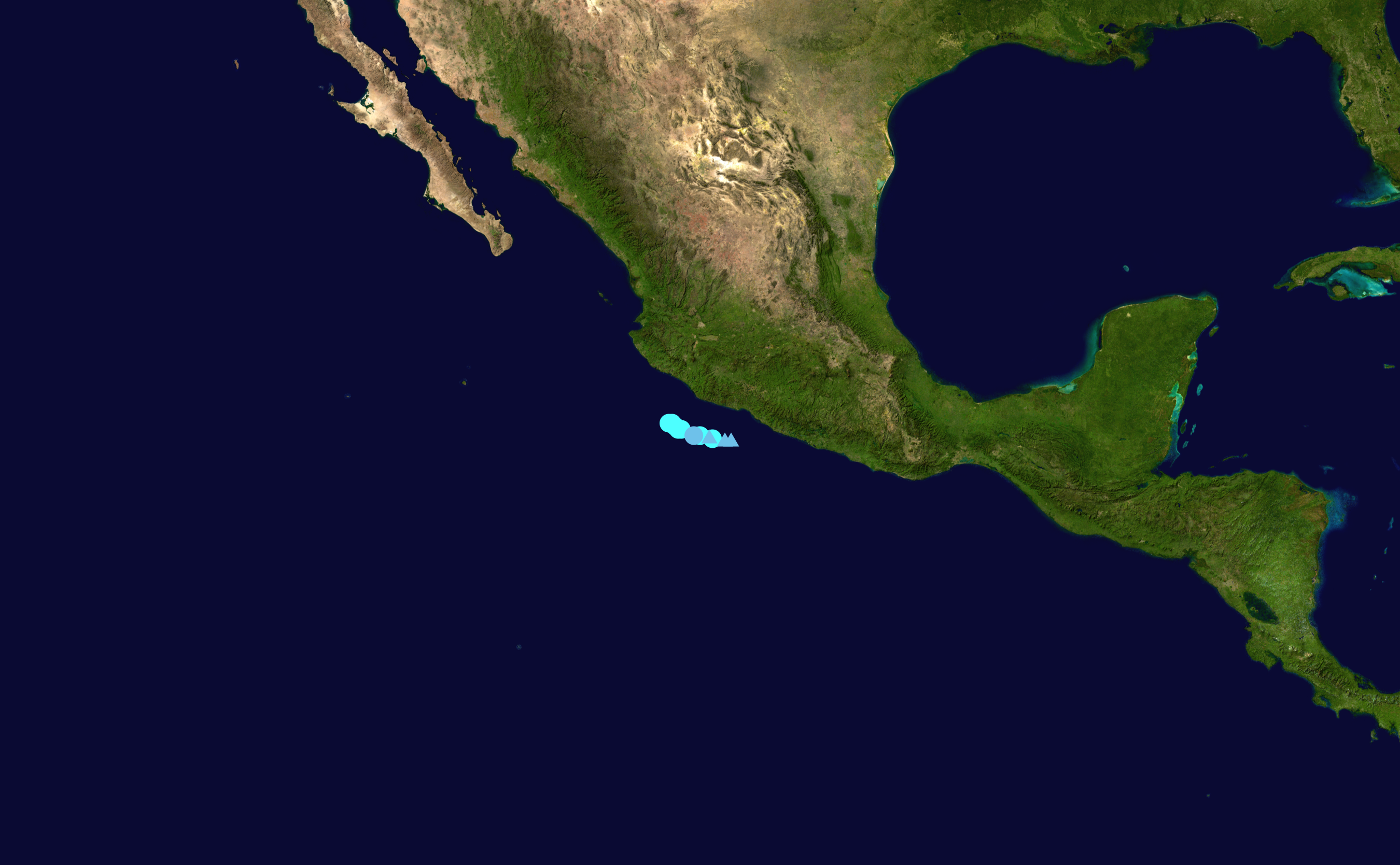
- Duration: June 30 – July 2
- Peak intensity: 50 mph (85 km/h) (1-min); 1002 mbar (hPa)

A well-defined tropical wave moved emerged off the western coast Africa on June 20. After entering the East Pacific a week later, shower and thunderstorm activity began to increase. Although the system lacked a closed low initially, a small circulation was noted by 06:00 UTC on June 30, and the system was declared Tropical Storm Elida accordingly. Paralleling the southwestern coast of Mexico, the cyclone attained peak winds of 45 mph (70 km/h) before strong northwesterly wind shear from nearby Tropical Storm Douglas caused the storm to become disheveled. It weakened to a tropical depression at 00:00 UTC on July 2 and degenerated into a remnant low six hours later. The remnant low drifted southeastward before dissipating early on July 3.

=== Tropical Storm Fausto ===
- Tropical storm (SSHWS)
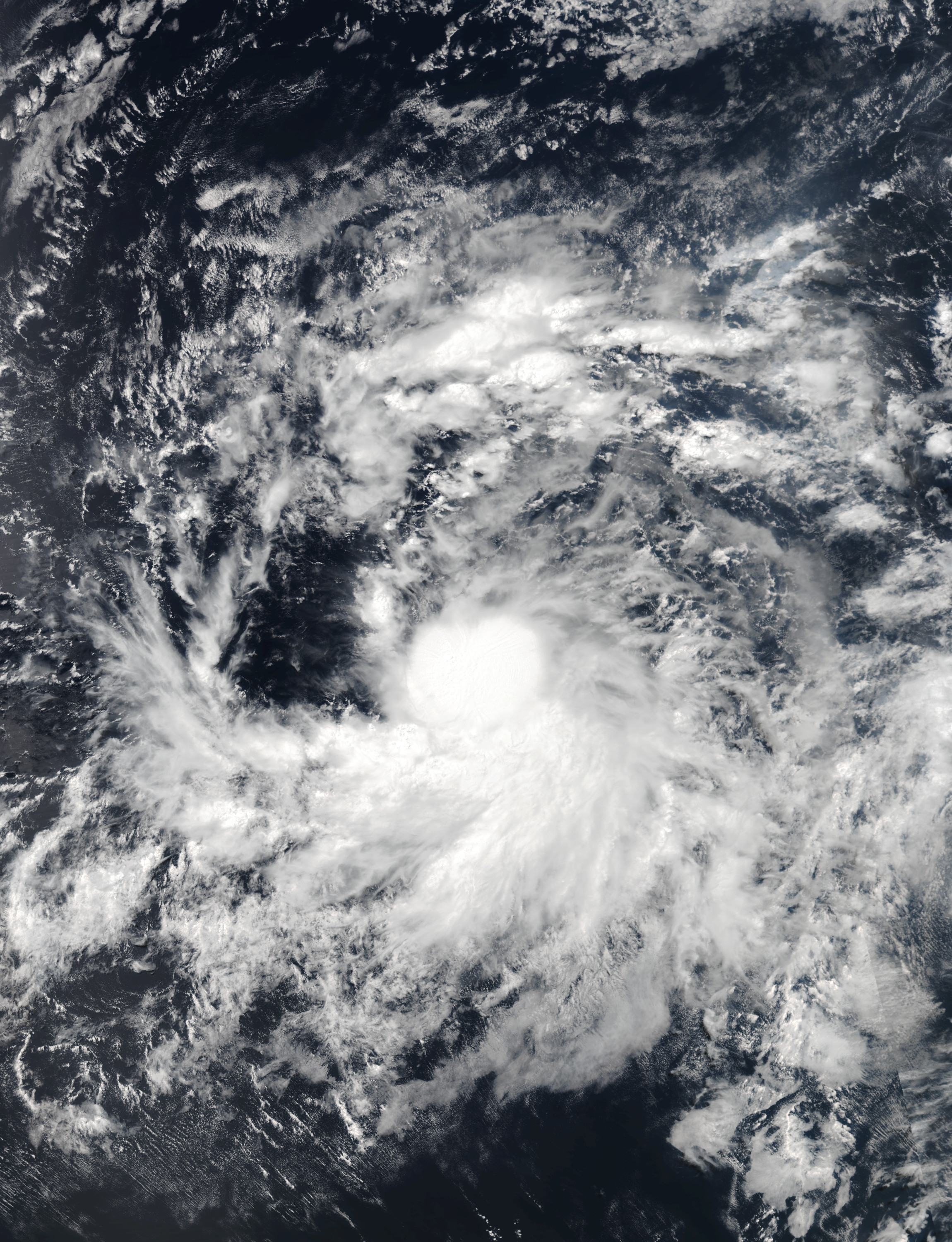
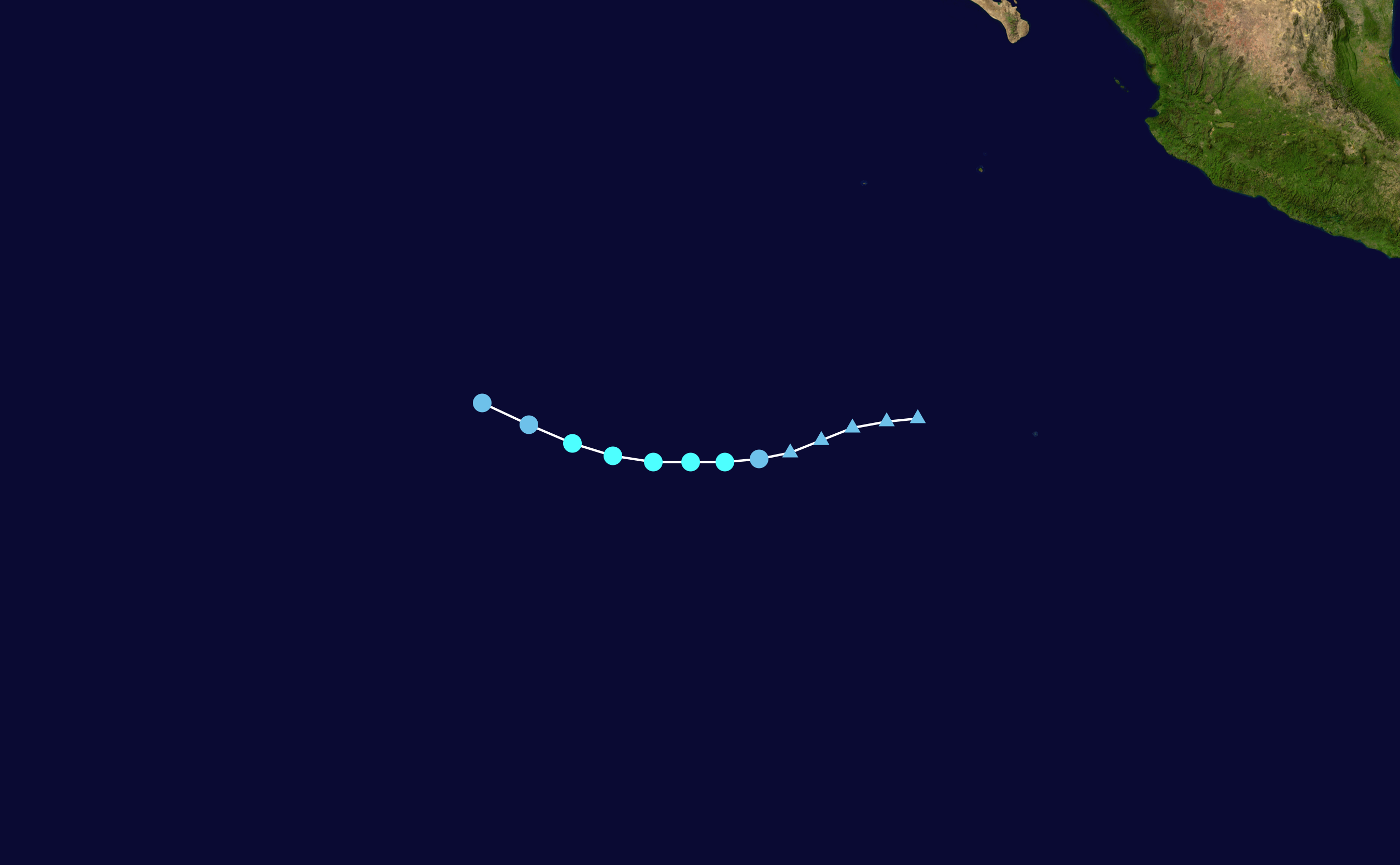
- Duration: July 7 – July 9
- Peak intensity: 45 mph (75 km/h) (1-min); 1004 mbar (hPa)

A tropical wave moved off the western coast of Africa on June 22 and entered the East Pacific eight days later. On July 4, convection increased with the aid of a convectively-coupled kelvin wave, and two days later, a broad area of low pressure formed along the wave axis well south-southwest of Baja California. After further organization, the disturbance was declared a tropical depression at 12:00 UTC on July 7. Steered westward around a subtropical ridge, the depression intensified into Tropical Storm Fausto six hours later and simultaneously attained peak winds of 45 mph (70 km/h). By early on July 9, Fausto weakened to a tropical depression as dry air became entrained into the circulation. The low-level center opened up into a trough by 12:00 UTC, marking the demise of the cyclone.

=== Tropical Storm Wali ===
- Tropical storm (SSHWS)
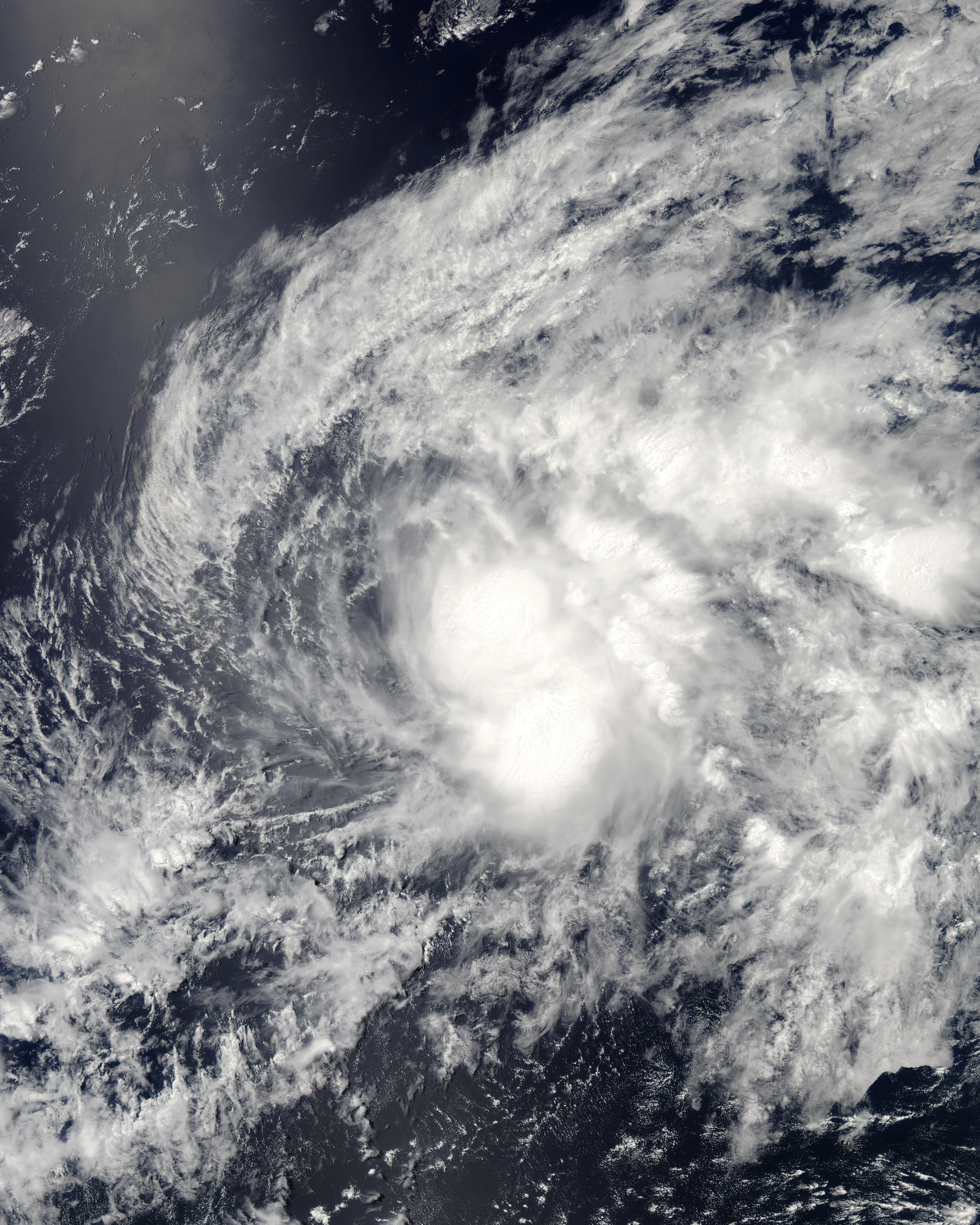
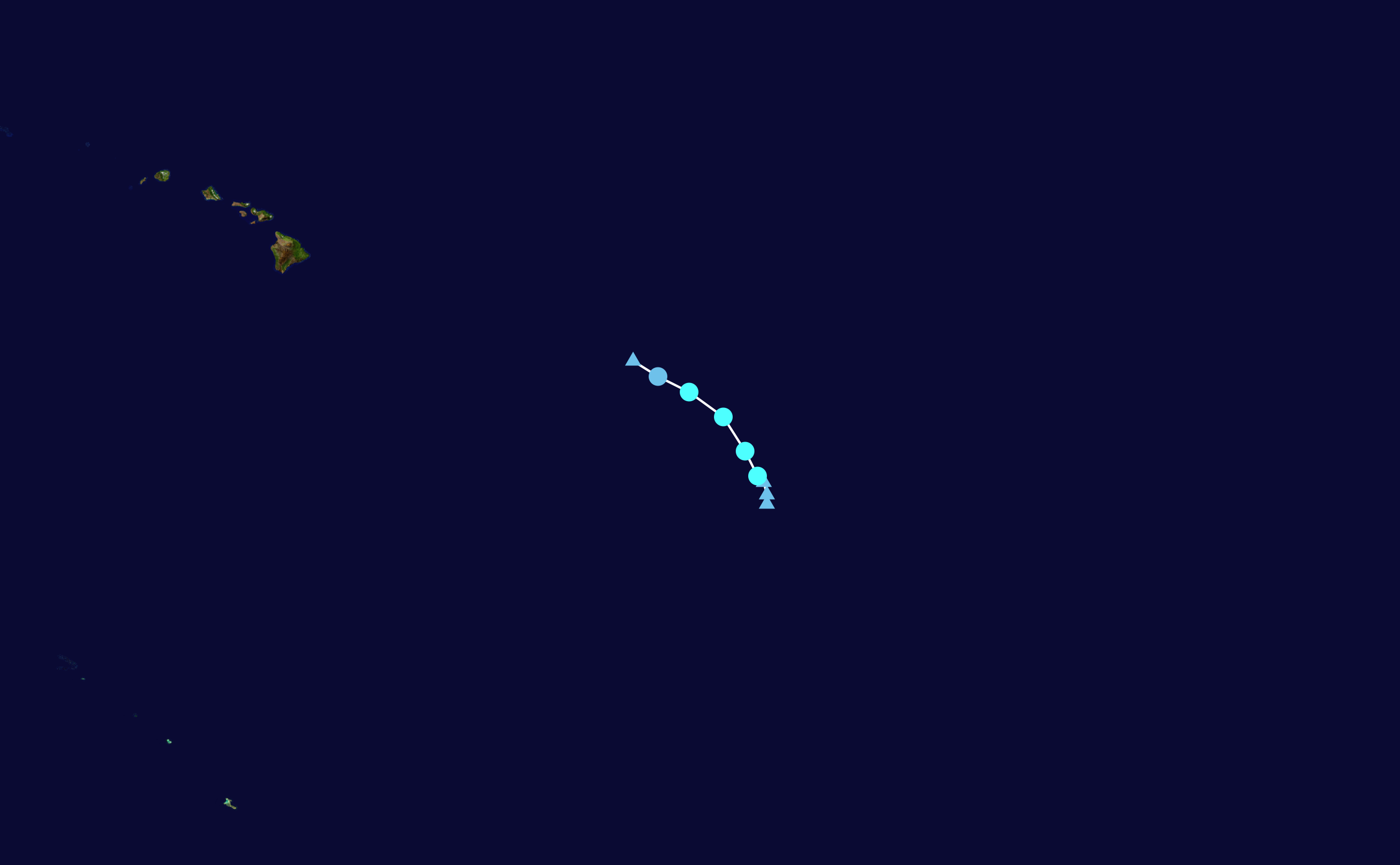
- Duration: July 17 – July 18
- Peak intensity: 45 mph (75 km/h) (1-min); 1003 mbar (hPa)

On July 13, the NHC began to monitor a large area of disturbed weather centered about 1,500 mi (2,415 km) west-southwest of the southern tip of the Baja California peninsula associated with a tropical wave. The disturbance crossed into the central North Pacific basin three days later, there the deep convection around the center soon began to organize. A tropical depression formed on July 17, and the depression strengthened into Tropical Storm Wali later that day, with amid marginal sea surface temperatures of 79–81 °F (26–27 °C). The storm attained sustained winds of 45 mph (75 km/h) at 00:00 UTC on July 18, but increasing westerly wind shear stymied further strengthening. Wali's movement was to the northwest, steered by a mid-level ridge to its north and an upper trough west of the main Hawaiian Islands. Wali weakened to a tropical depression at 18:00 UTC that same day, and degenerated into a remnant low six hours later. The remnants of Wali passed around 500 mi (805 km) southwest of the island of Hawaii during the evening of July 19.

After degenerating, the spreading plume of Wali's remnant moisture interacted with an unstable air mass beneath the eastern flank of a separate upper trough over the Hawaiian Islands on July 19–20, triggering thunderstorms across the island of Hawaii and then significant rainfall on Oahu. Rainfall totals on Oahu mostly ranged from 5 in (130 mm) to 10 in (250 mm), though multiple sites along the windward slopes of the Koolau Range received more, with several receiving over 4 in (100 mm) per hour. The rain gage at Kahana Bay Beach showed that 13.84 in (352 mm) fell in a 12 hours. Heavy rainfall also affected Molokai and Maui. Property damage from the storm was reported on Oahu and on Maui. There were no fatalities due to the flooding; however, one fatality related to the rain event was reported when a swimmer drowned in rough seas in Maalaea Bay, near Molokini.

=== Hurricane Genevieve ===
- Category 3 hurricane (SSHWS)
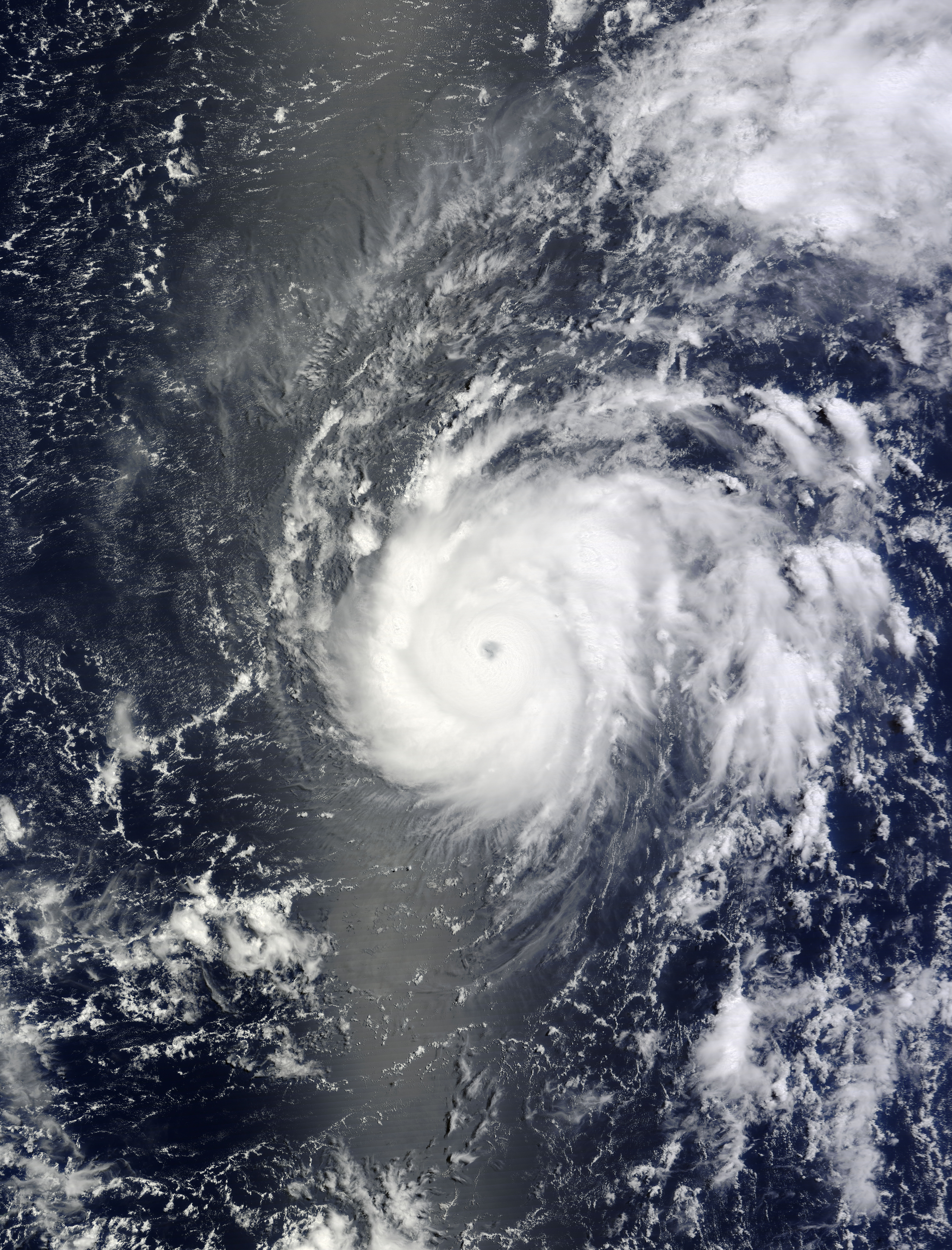
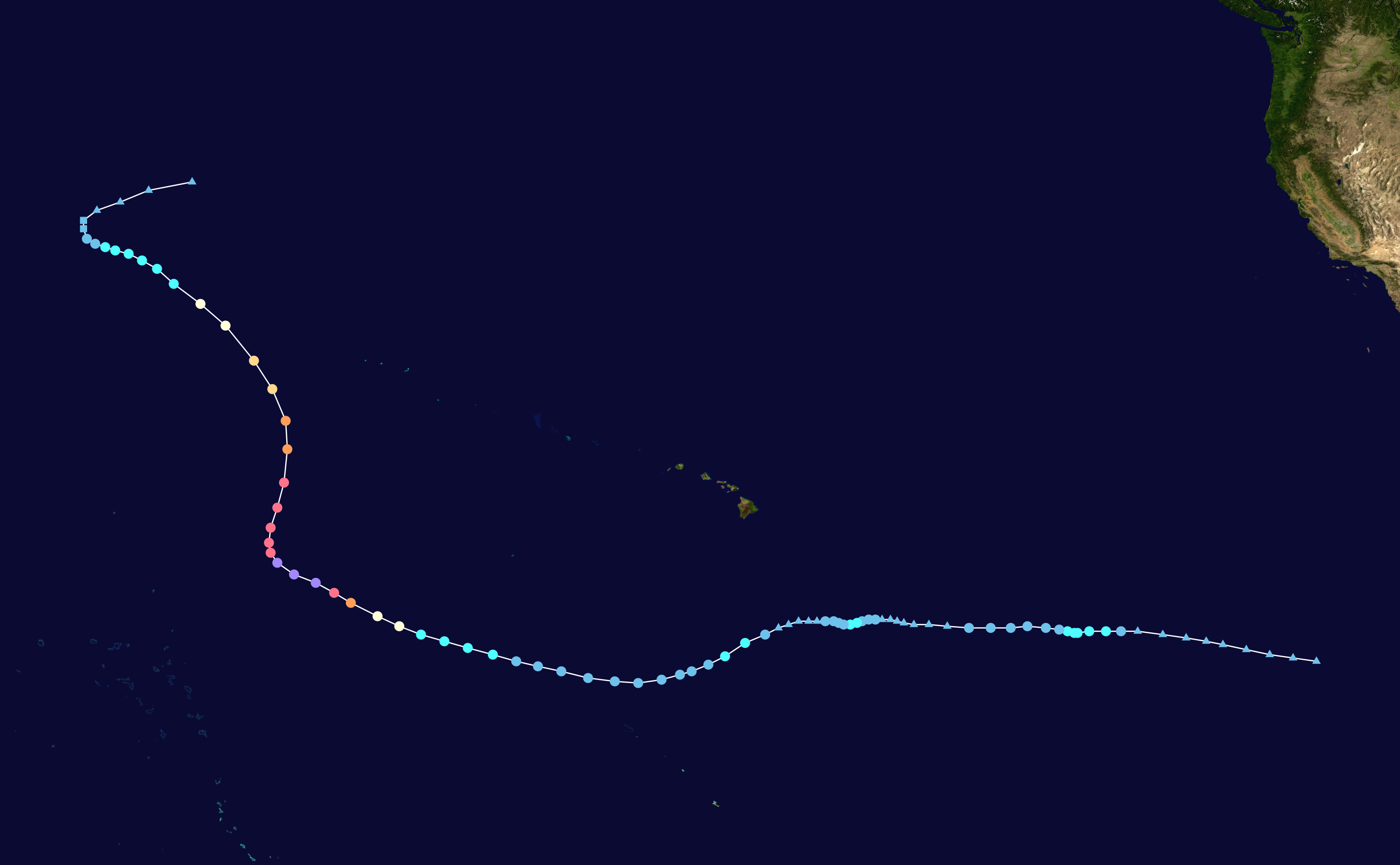
- Duration: July 25 – August 7 (Exited basin)
- Peak intensity: 115 mph (185 km/h) (1-min); 965 mbar (hPa)

A disturbance first identified south of Panama on July 15 continued west and organized into a tropical depression around 00:00 UTC on July 25; it intensified into Tropical Storm Genevieve six hours later. Increasing wind shear caused the cyclone to degenerate to a remnant low early on July 28 after it entered the central Pacific, and although it regenerated and subsequently intensified into a tropical storm again two days later, an unfavorable environment caused it to lose its status as a tropical cyclone for a second time around 00:00 UTC on August 1. Genevieve once again regenerated to a tropical depression around 06:00 UTC on August 2, and it continued west across the central Pacific as a low-end system for several days. An intensification trend began in earnest on August 5, and Genevieve attained hurricane strength around 12:00 UTC the next morning before beginning a period of rapid intensification. It attained major hurricane intensity before crossing the International Date Line into the western Pacific early on August 7, where the system further intensified into a Category 5-equivalent typhoon.

=== Hurricane Hernan ===
- Category 1 hurricane (SSHWS)
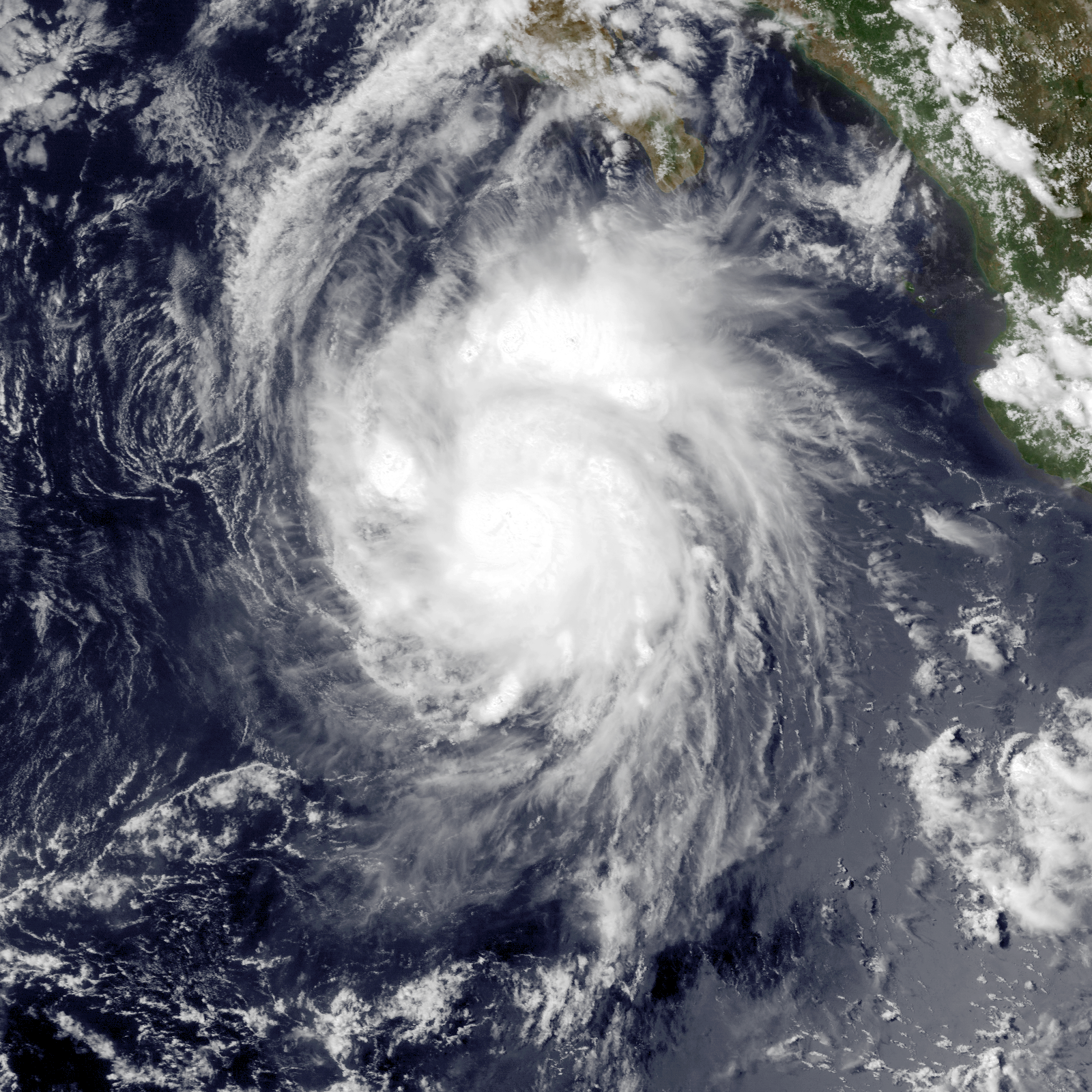
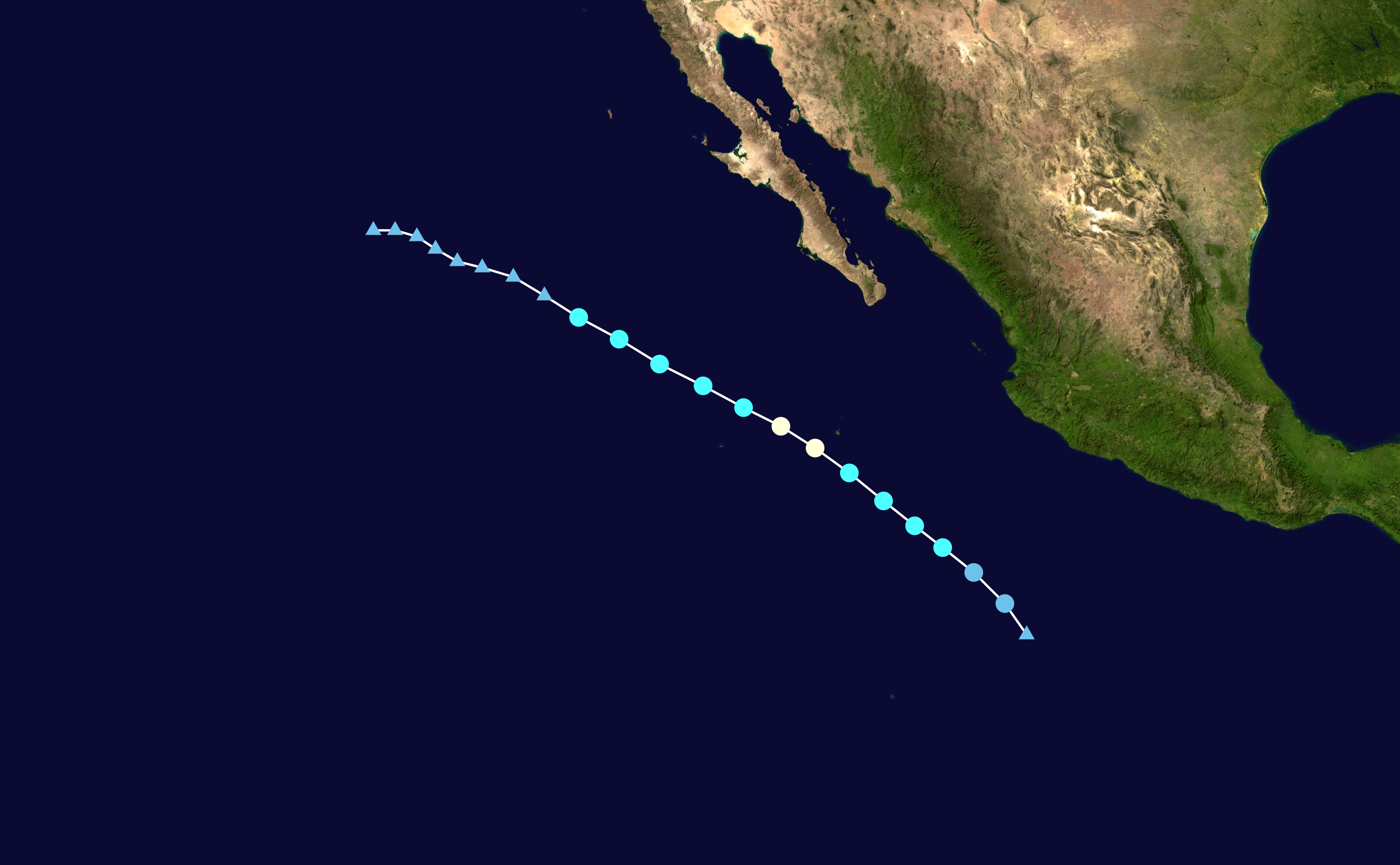
- Duration: July 26 – July 29
- Peak intensity: 75 mph (120 km/h) (1-min); 992 mbar (hPa)

A tropical wave moved off the western coast of Africa on July 12 and reached the East Pacific by July 21. Initially devoid of convection, shower and thunderstorm activity increased significantly a few days later, possibly due to the passage of a convectively-coupled kelvin wave. Following the development of a closed area of low pressure, the disturbance was designated as a tropical depression at 06:00 UTC on July 26 while located about 405 mi (650 km) southwest of Zihuatanejo, Mexico; twelve hours later, it was upgraded to Tropical Storm Hernan. Influenced by a mid-level ridge over the southern United States and Mexico, the cyclone moved west-northwest to northwest while quickly strengthening. At 18:00 UTC on July 27, Hernan intensified into a Category 1 hurricane and simultaneously attained peak winds of 75 mph (120 km/h). Thereafter, increasing westerly shear and cooling ocean temperatures caused the storm to begin weakening. Hernan was downgraded to a tropical storm at 06:00 UTC on July 28 and degenerated into a remnant low at 12:00 UTC the following day. The remnant low slowed and turned west prior to dissipating early on July 31.

=== Hurricane Iselle ===
- Category 4 hurricane (SSHWS)
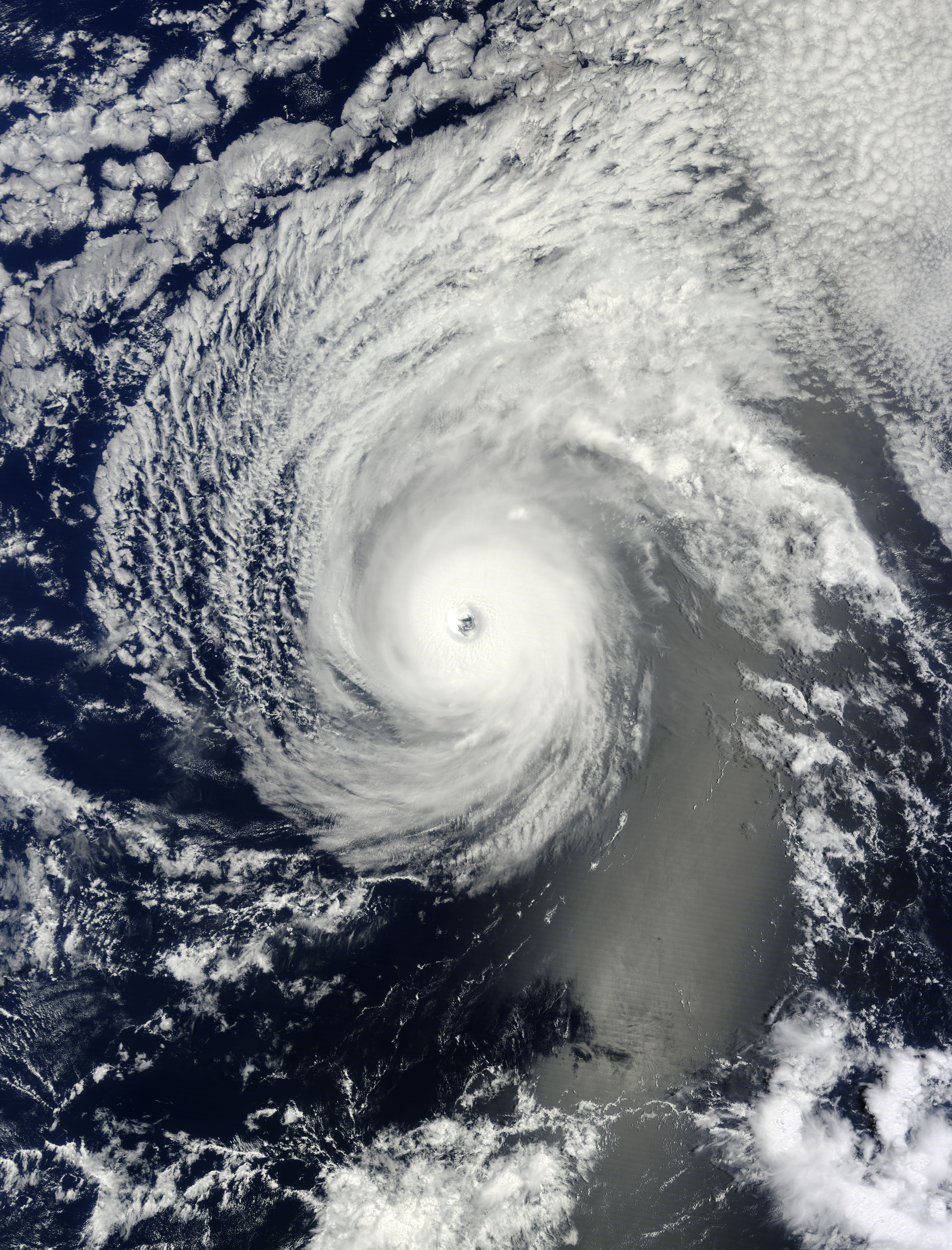
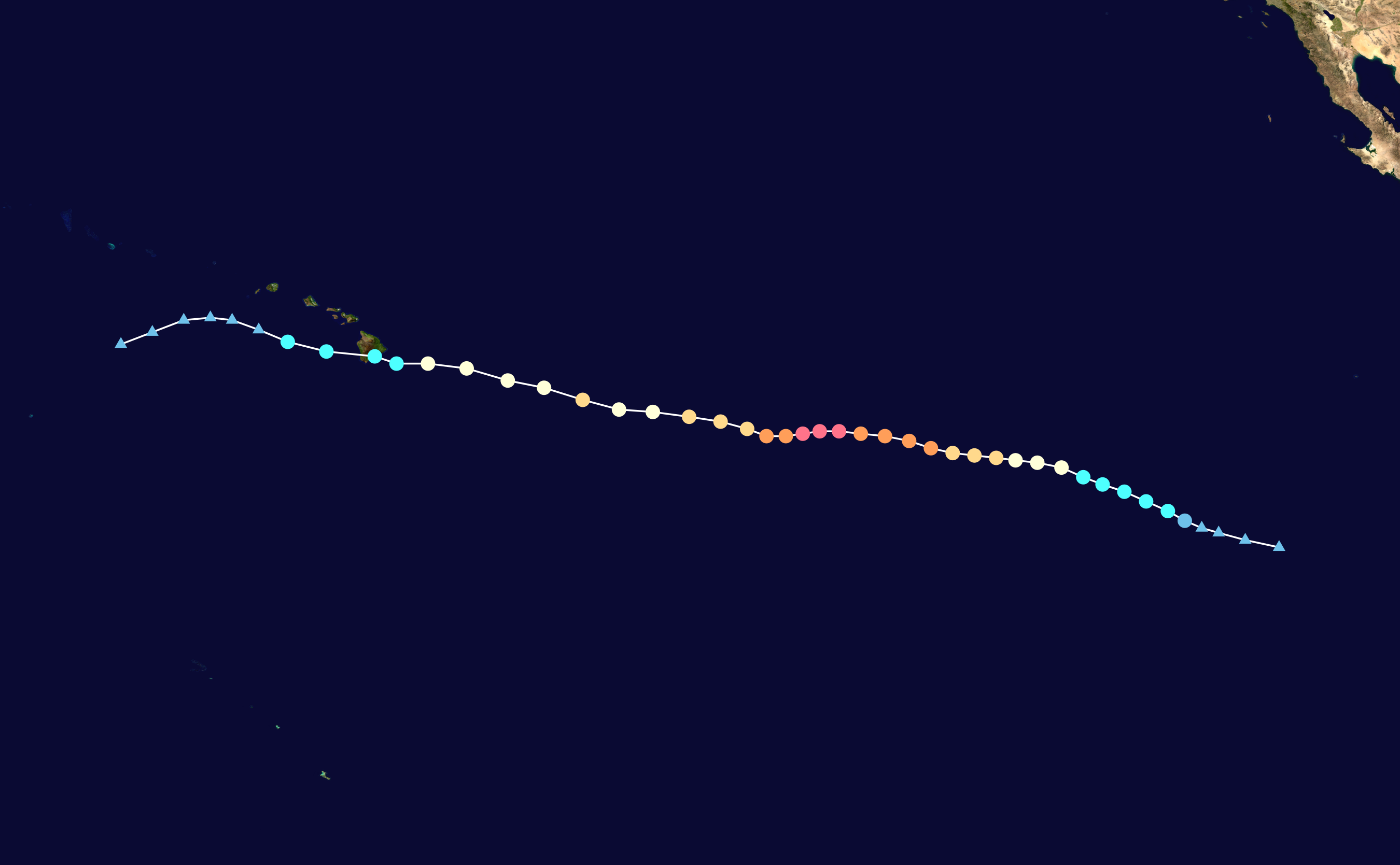
- Duration: July 31 – August 9
- Peak intensity: 140 mph (220 km/h) (1-min); 947 mbar (hPa)

A tropical wave emerged from Africa on July 14, eventually organizing into a tropical depression over the eastern Pacific around 12:00 UTC on July 31; six hours later, it strengthened into Tropical Storm Iselle. A mid-level ridge over Mexico directed the system west-northwest, while improving upper-level winds allowed Iselle to begin rapid intensification. Iselle reached hurricane intensity around 00:00 UTC on August 2 and major hurricane strength by 12:00 UTC the next day. As the hurricane moved parallel to the 26 °C isotherm, its cloud pattern evolved to resemble an annular hurricane, with a large eye and lack of convective bands. It intensified into a Category 4 hurricane early on August 4 and attained peak winds of 140 mph (225 km/h) around 18:00 UTC that day. Increased wind shear prompted a weakening trend as the system entered the central Pacific, and it weakened to a tropical storm by 06:00 UTC on August 8 before making landfall just east of Pahala, Hawaii, with winds of 60 mph (95 km/h) six hours later. The high terrain of Hawaii contributed to the disruption of Iselle's cloud pattern, and it degenerated to a remnant low by 06:00 UTC on August 9 before dissipating west of the island late the next day.

=== Hurricane Julio ===
- Category 3 hurricane (SSHWS)
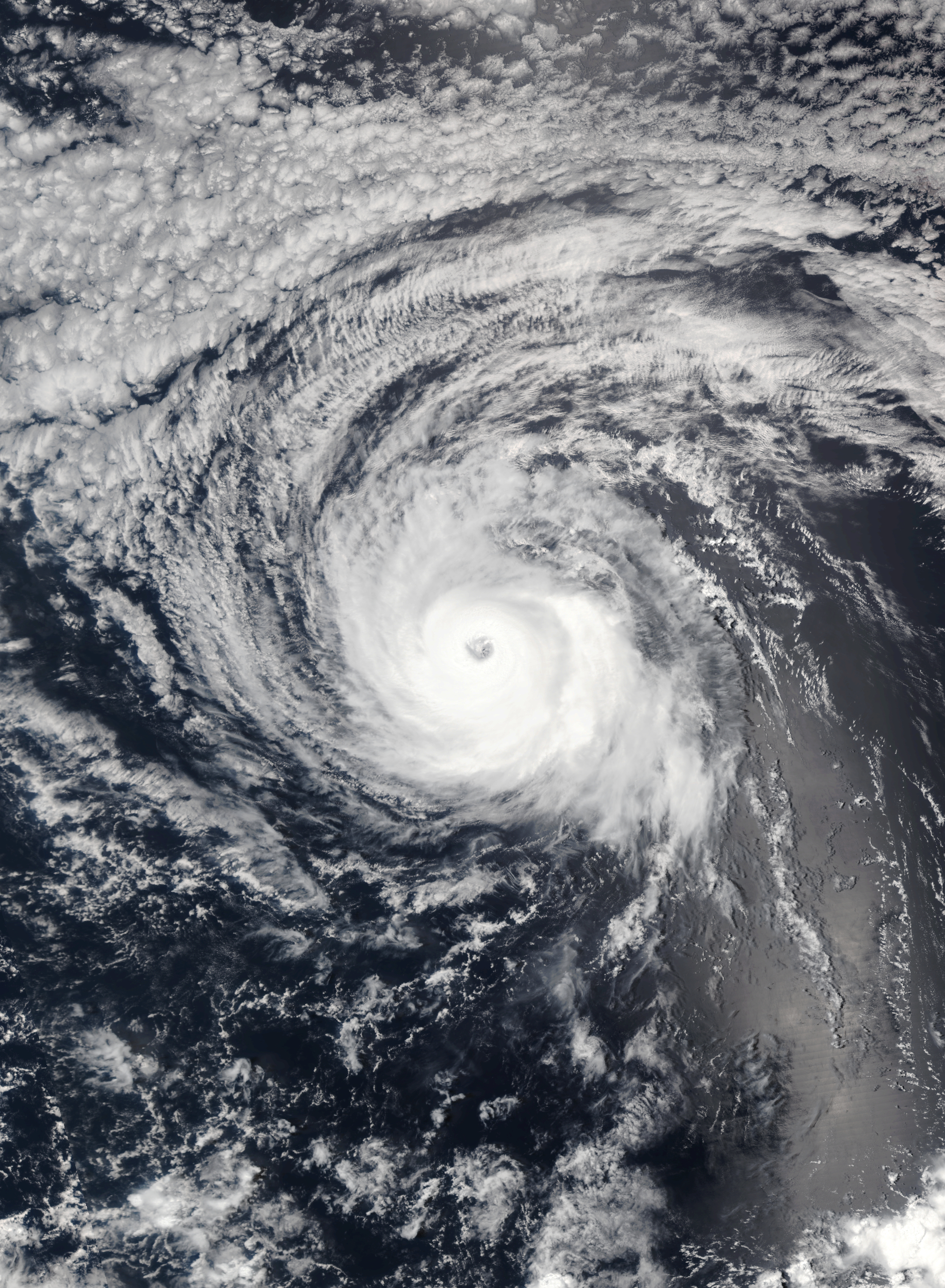
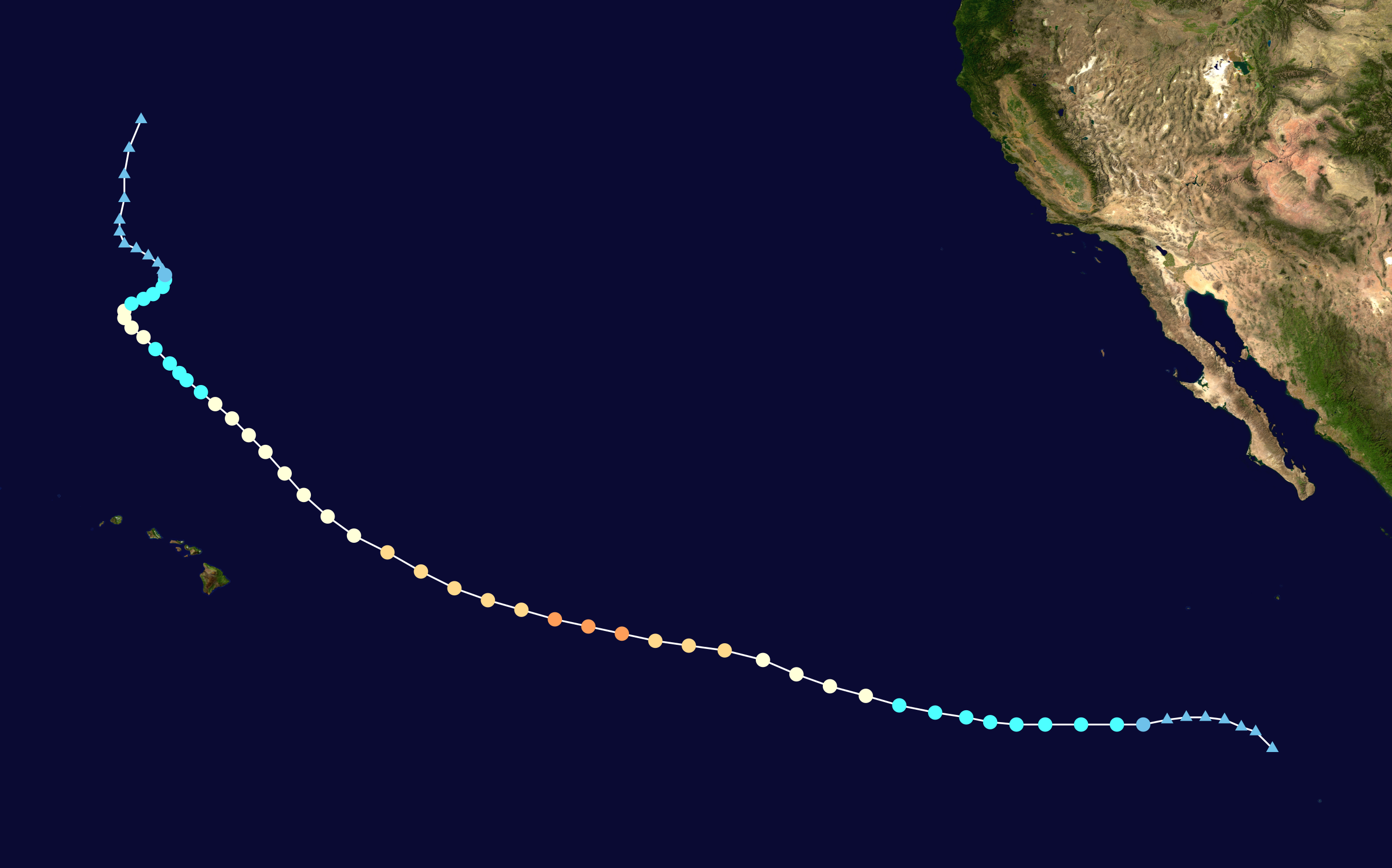
- Duration: August 4 – August 15
- Peak intensity: 120 mph (195 km/h) (1-min); 960 mbar (hPa)

Julio originated from a tropical wave that moved off Africa on July 20, ultimately organizing into a tropical depression well southwest of Baja California by 00:00 UTC on August 4. After intensifying into a tropical storm six hours later, it tracked west-northwest. Light northeasterly wind shear allowed the cyclone to reach hurricane strength around 06:00 UTC on August 6 and further organize to its peak as a Category 3 with winds of 120 mph (195 km/h) two days later, despite cool ocean temperatures. Shortly after entering the central Pacific, Julio began to weaken as a result of cold water upwelling. Although the cyclone fell to a tropical storm early on August 12, an upper-level environment still favorable for strengthening allowed Julio to briefly regain hurricane strength the next day. Julio fell below hurricane strength once again early on August 14 as southwesterly wind shear increased, weakened to a tropical depression early on August 15, and degenerated to a remnant low around 18:00 UTC that day. The low dissipated over the far northern Pacific on August 18.

=== Hurricane Karina ===
- Category 1 hurricane (SSHWS)
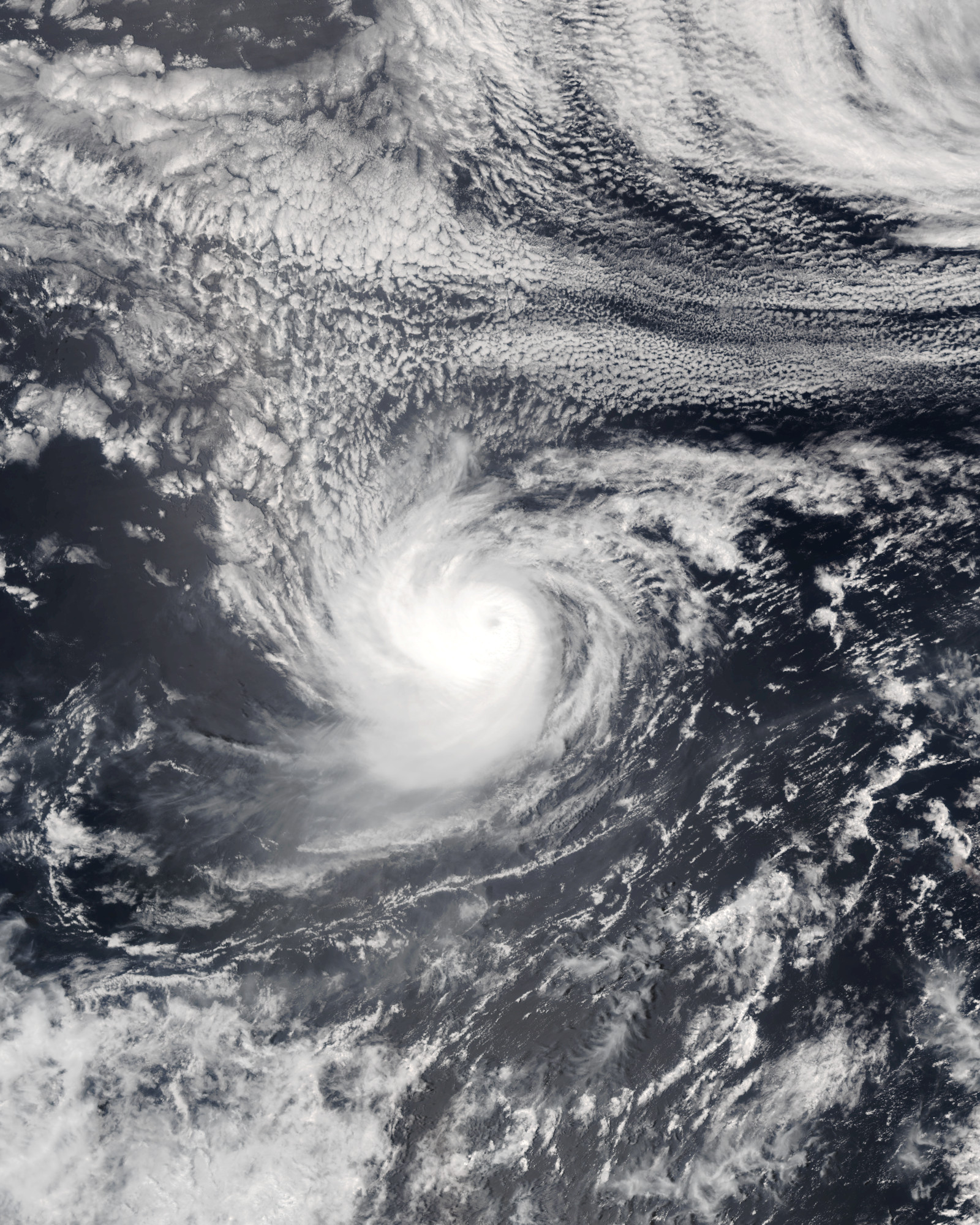
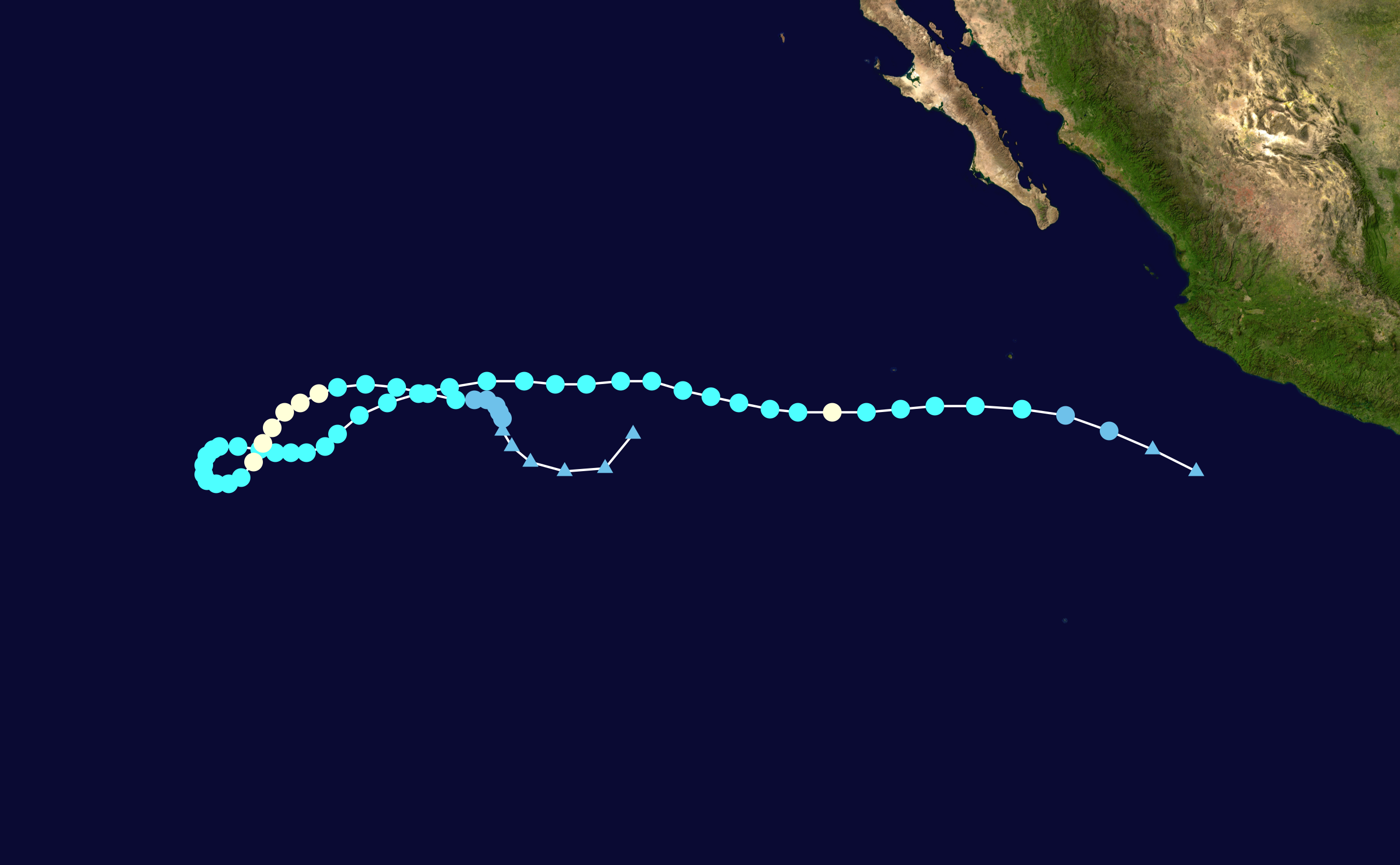
- Duration: August 13 – August 26
- Peak intensity: 85 mph (140 km/h) (1-min); 983 mbar (hPa)

A tropical wave left Africa on July 28, crossing Central America to become a tropical depression by 00:00 UTC on August 12. The newly formed system strengthened as it moved west-northwest, becoming Tropical Storm Karina around 12:00 UTC the next morning, and further intensifying to a hurricane by 18:00 UTC on August 14. Increasingly easterly shear eroded the hurricane's inner core, and Karina dramatically weakened as a result. By August 19, as it remained disorganized, a large ridge to its north diminished and a sprawling tropical cyclone—Lowell—formed to its east, leading to weak steering currents that allowed Karina to meander. It executed a three-day-long cyclonic loop, while environmental conditions began to improve, and became a hurricane again by 18:00 UTC on August 22; twelve hours later, Karina reached peak winds of 85 mph (135 km/h). Lower ocean temperatures and increasing shear soon deteriorated the storm's cloud pattern, and it fell below hurricane strength early on August 24. Lacking persistent convection, Karina degenerated to a remnant area of low pressure by 18:00 UTC on August 26. The remnant low moved around the southern portion of nearby Hurricane Marie and dissipated early on August 28.

=== Hurricane Lowell ===
- Category 1 hurricane (SSHWS)
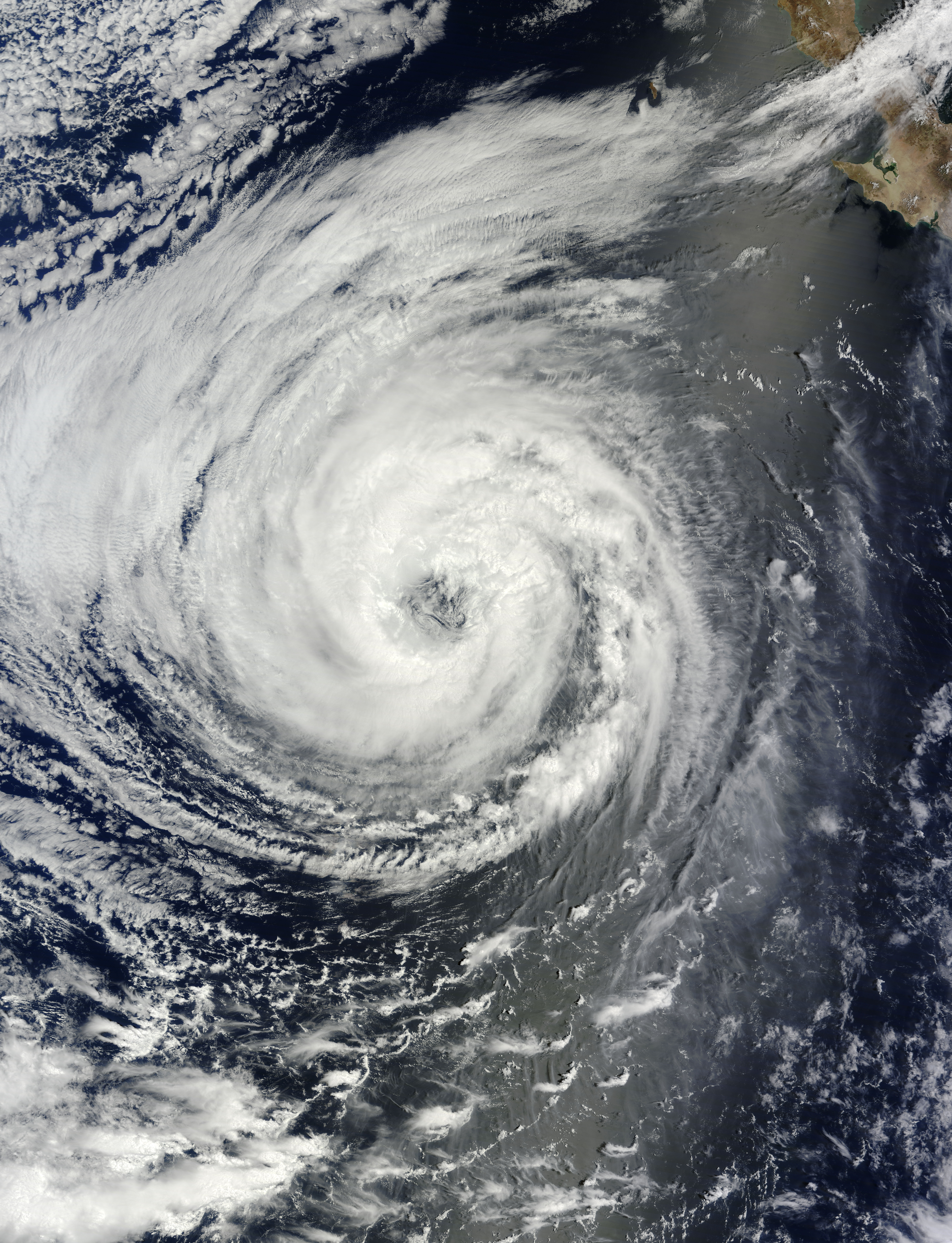
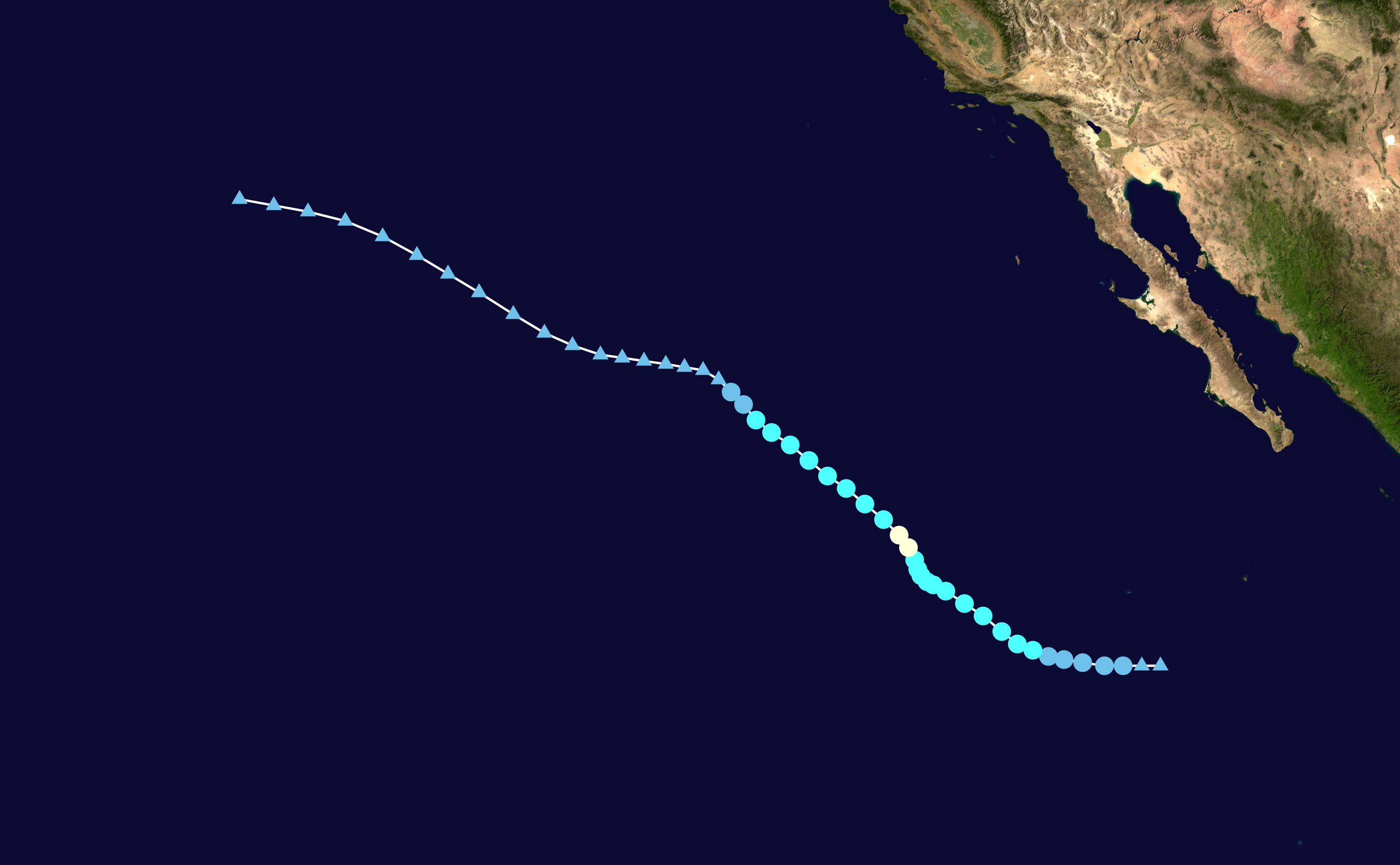
- Duration: August 17 – August 24
- Peak intensity: 75 mph (120 km/h) (1-min); 980 mbar (hPa)

A tropical wave departed Africa on August 1, crossing Central America to become a tropical depression around 12:00 UTC on August 17. With a circulation about 920 mi (1,480 km) across, the unusually large system only slowly organized, becoming Tropical Storm Lowell around 18:00 UTC on August 18. Strong upper-level winds that had been plaguing the system weakened as it moved west then northwest, and its large circulation contracted, allowing Lowell to attain hurricane strength with peak winds of 75 mph (120 km/h) by 12:00 UTC on August 21 as a large eye became evident. Low wind shear allowed Lowell to only slowly decrease in intensity over the coming days despite cooling ocean temperatures. It became a tropical depression early on August 24 and degenerated to a remnant low around 12:00 UTC that morning. The post-tropical cyclone turned west and remained distinct until late on August 28, when it dissipated into an open trough well northeast of Hawaii.

=== Hurricane Marie ===
- Category 5 hurricane (SSHWS)
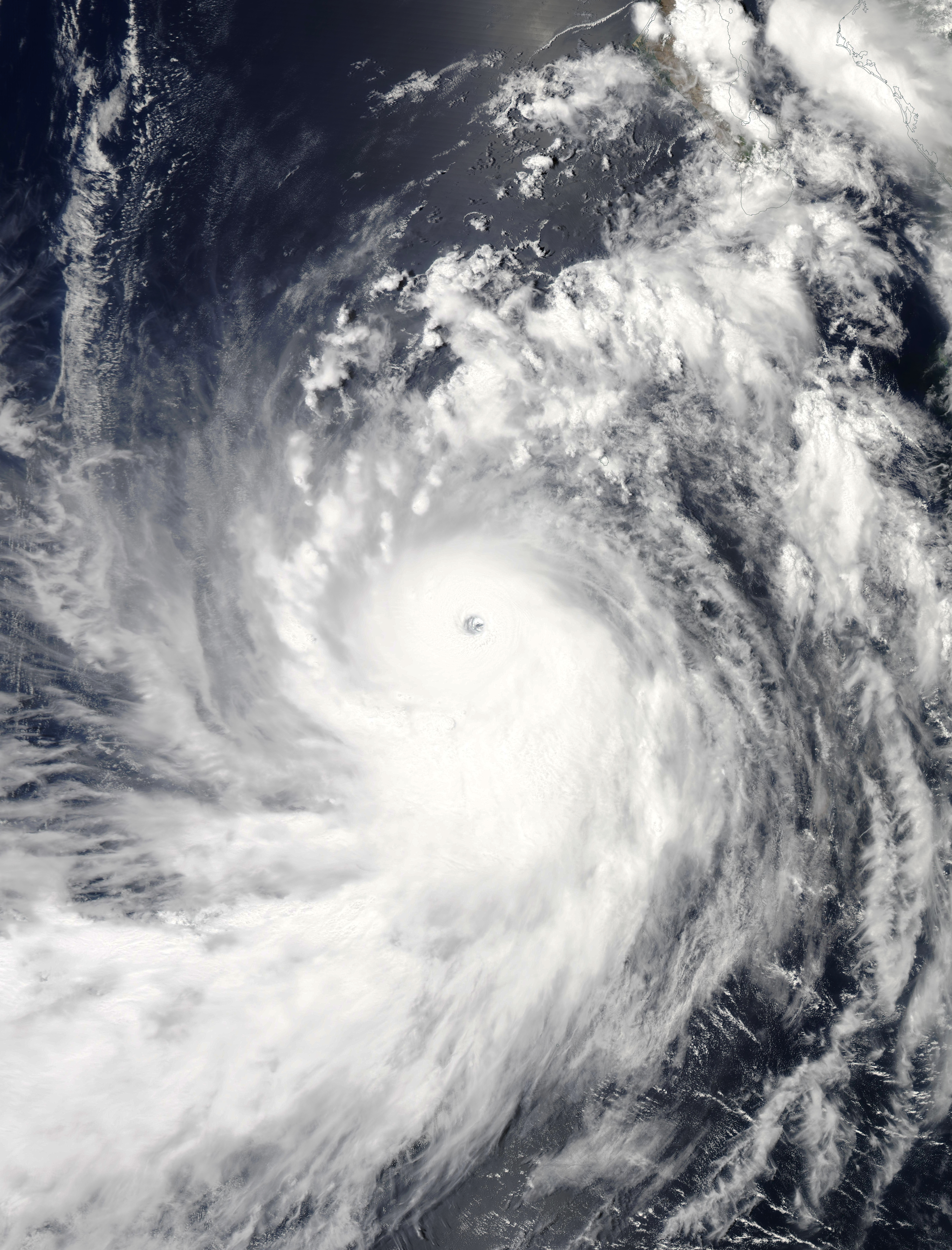
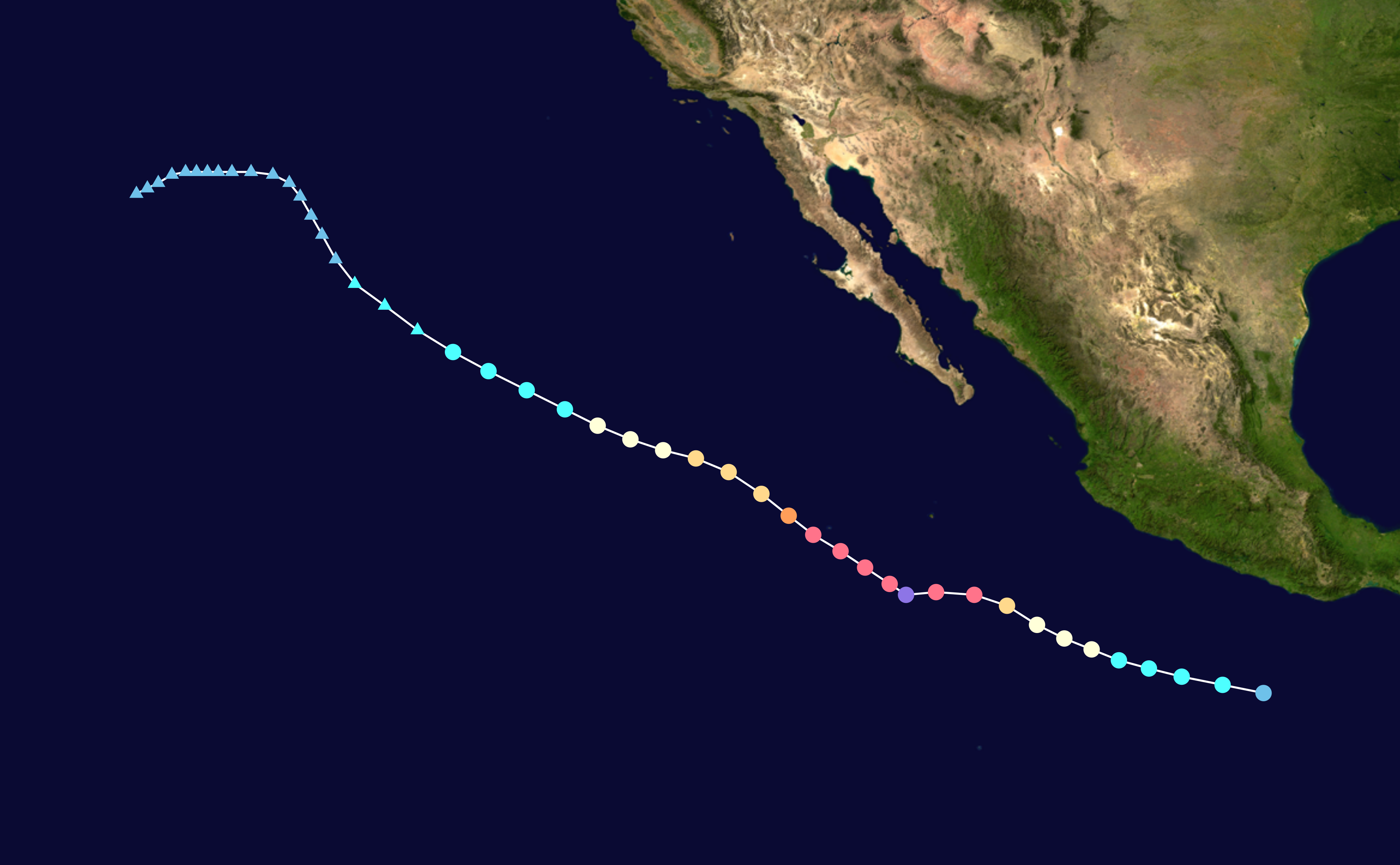
- Duration: August 22 – August 28
- Peak intensity: 160 mph (260 km/h) (1-min); 918 mbar (hPa)

A tropical wave crossed the coast of Africa on August 10, developing into a tropical depression over the East Pacific around 00:00 UTC on August 22. Embedded in a very favorable environment, the system intensified into Tropical Storm Marie six hours later, part of a larger 66-hour period of rapid intensification that ultimately brought the storm to its peak as a Category 5 hurricane with winds of 160 mph (255 km/h) around 18:00 UTC on August 24. An eyewall replacement cycle later that day curbed the strengthening trend, and by August 26, a persistent ridge over the southern United States directed Marie into cooler ocean waters; both of these events caused steady to rapid weakening. Marie weakened to a tropical storm around 18:00 UTC on August 27 and degenerated to a remnant low a day later. The low turned west and eventually dissipated, early on September 2.

=== Hurricane Norbert ===
- Category 3 hurricane (SSHWS)
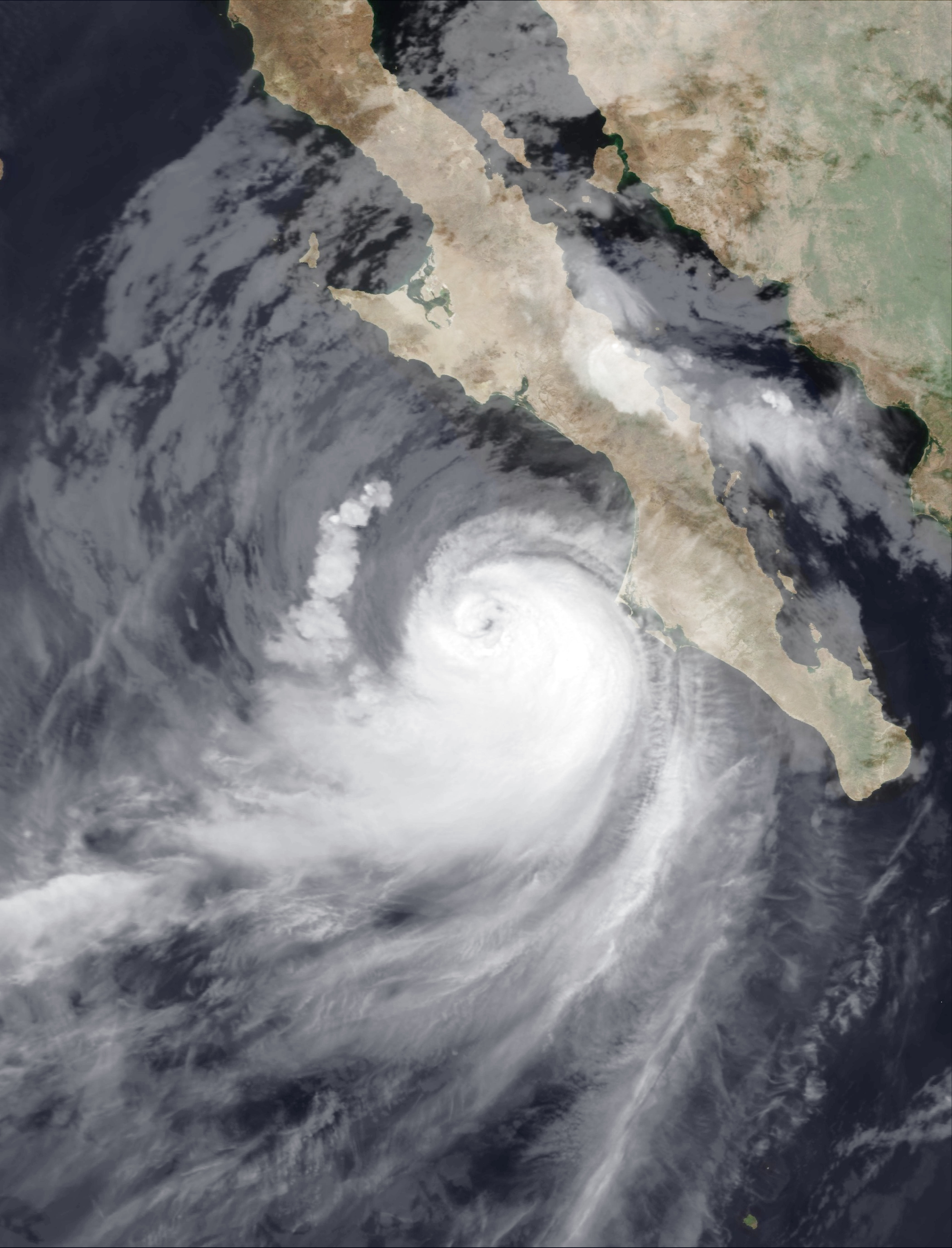
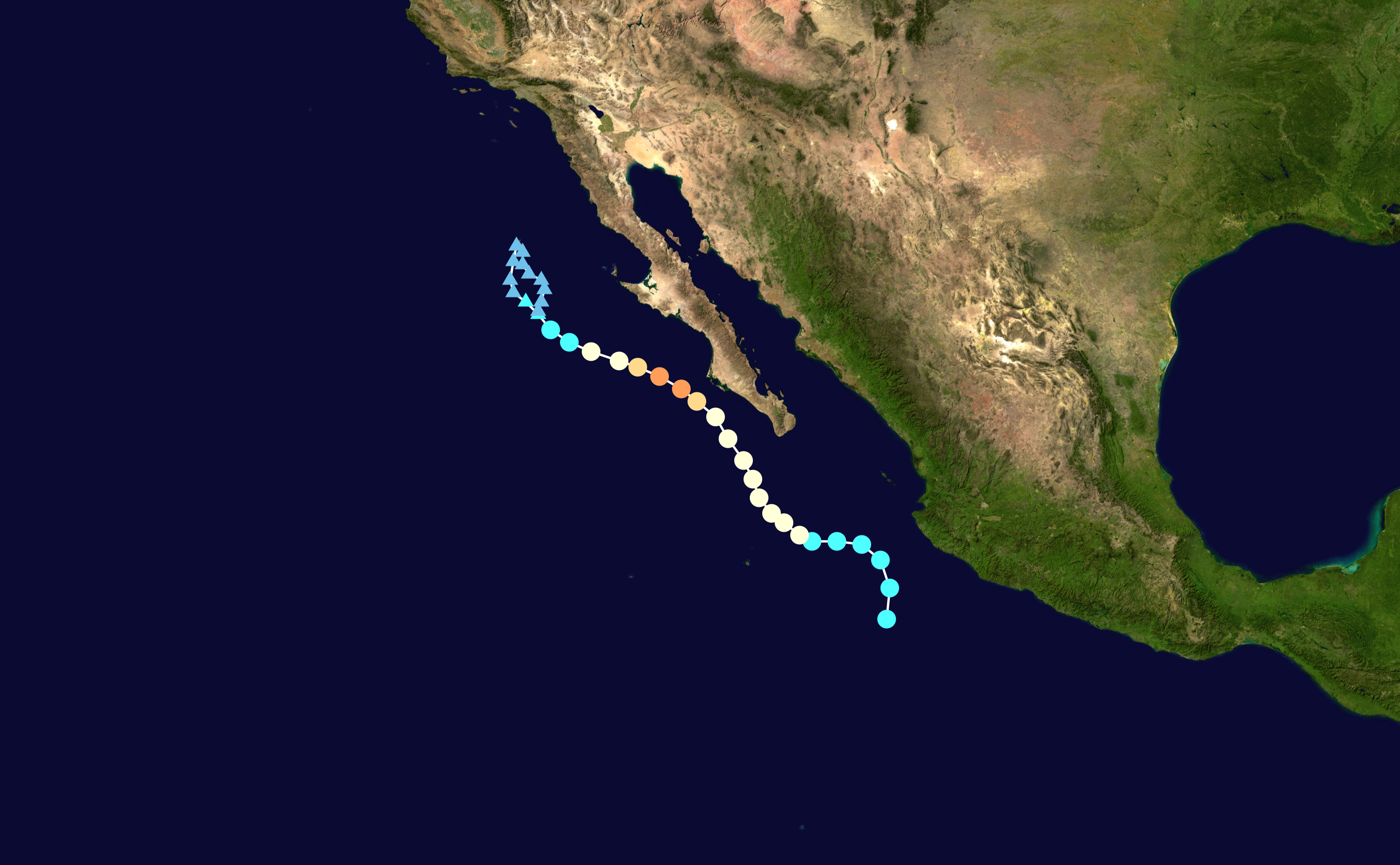
- Duration: September 2 – September 7
- Peak intensity: 125 mph (205 km/h) (1-min); 950 mbar (hPa)

A tropical wave departed Africa on August 18 and reached the East Pacific nearly two weeks later, where it steadily organized into Tropical Storm Norbert around 12:00 UTC on September 2. Departure from the ITCZ resulted in the system moving north initially, but a series of ridges over Mexico directed it on a west to northwest track for the remainder of its duration. Over anomalously warm ocean waters, and part of an increasingly favorable shear regime, Norbert intensified into a hurricane by 00:00 UTC on September 4. After levelling off in intensity the next day, the system quickly strengthened to its peak as a Category 3 hurricane with winds of 125 mph (200 km/h) around 06:00 UTC on September 6. Norbert passed west of Baja California and entered a drier environment, causing a rapid decay that caused it to degenerate to a remnant low by 00:00 UTC on September 7. The low meandered offshore before dissipating early on September 11.

=== Hurricane Odile ===
- Category 4 hurricane (SSHWS)
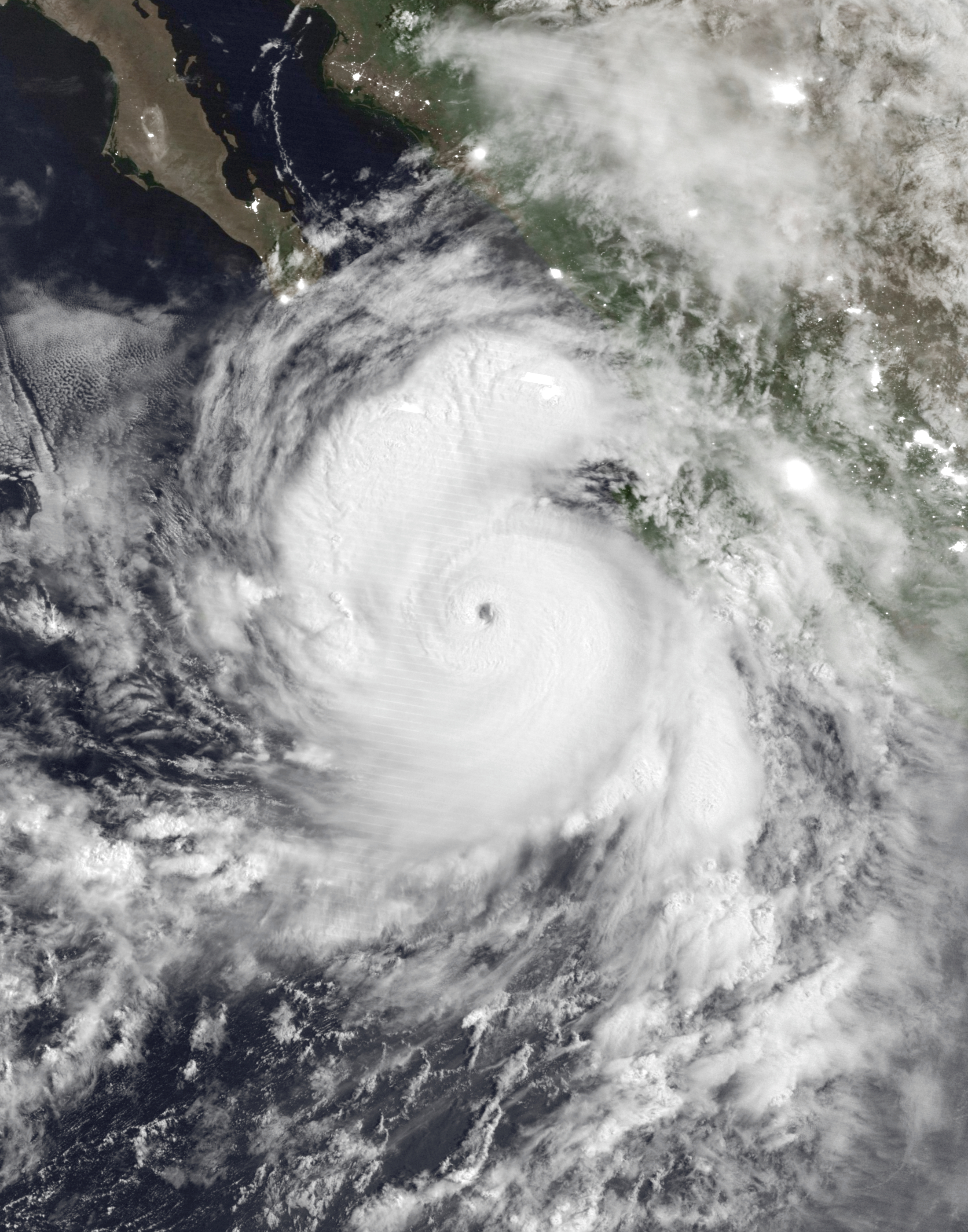
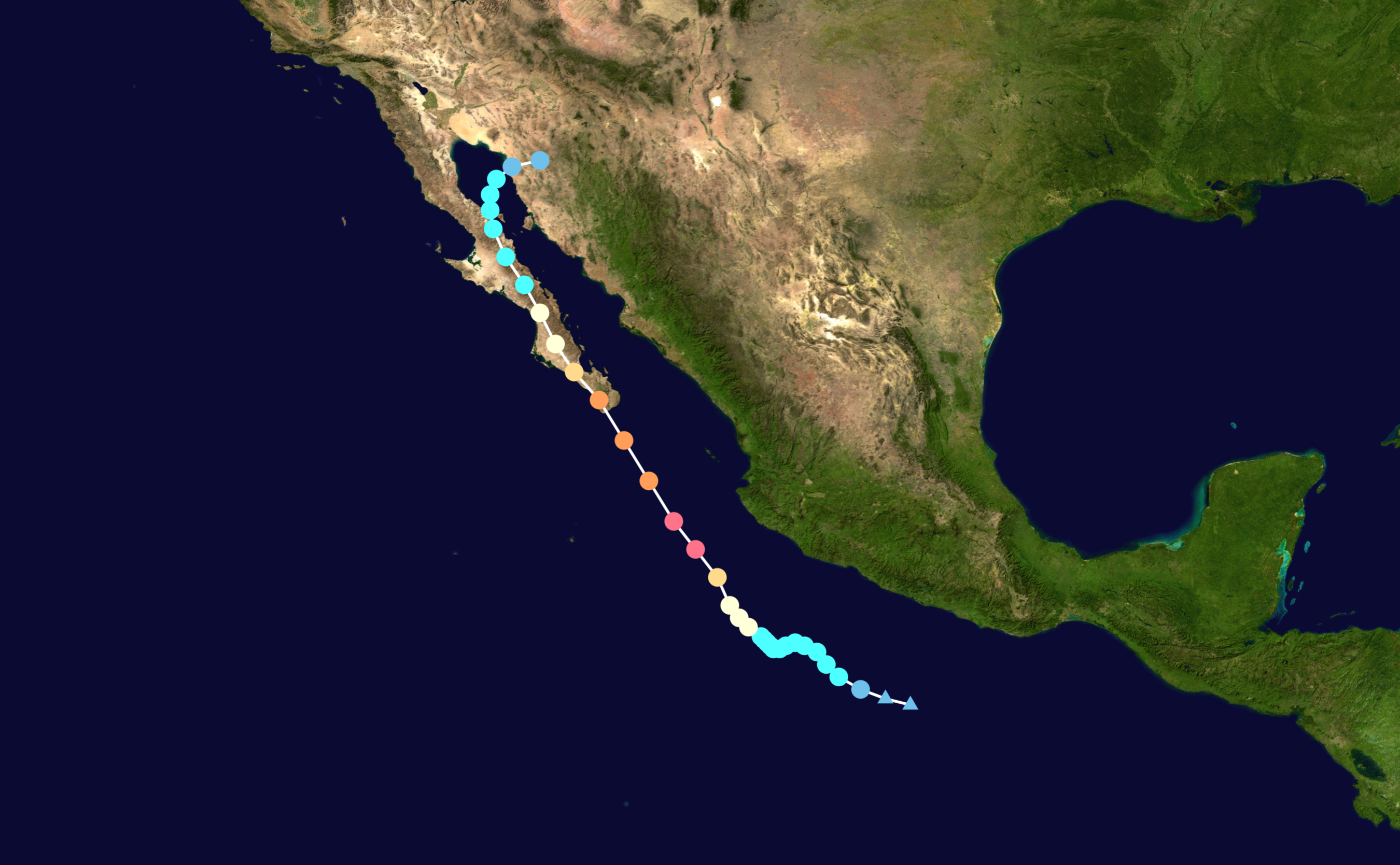
- Duration: September 10 – September 18
- Peak intensity: 140 mph (220 km/h) (1-min); 918 mbar (hPa)

The most destructive hurricane of the 2014 season began as a tropical depression around 00:00 UTC on September 10 from a tropical wave that first left Africa on August 28. Situated between two mid-level ridges, the system moved northwest while steadily intensifying, becoming Tropical Storm Odile six hours after formation and further strengthening into a hurricane by 06:00 UTC on September 13. A period of rapid intensification began at that time, with Odile's winds increasing from 75 mph (120 km/h) to a peak of 140 mph (225 km/h) within a 24-hour timeframe. The onset of an eyewall replacement cycle caused the hurricane to weaken slightly on September 14, but Odile still maintained winds of 125 mph (200 km/h) when it made landfall near Cabo San Lucas at 04:45 UTC. It continued up the spine of Baja California before curving northeast into the Gulf of California, ultimately making a second landfall near Alvaro Obregón, Mexico as a minimal tropical storm on September 17. Odile progressed inland and quickly dissipated over the mountainous terrain of Mexico by 06:00 UTC the next day.

=== Tropical Depression Sixteen-E ===
- Tropical depression (SSHWS)
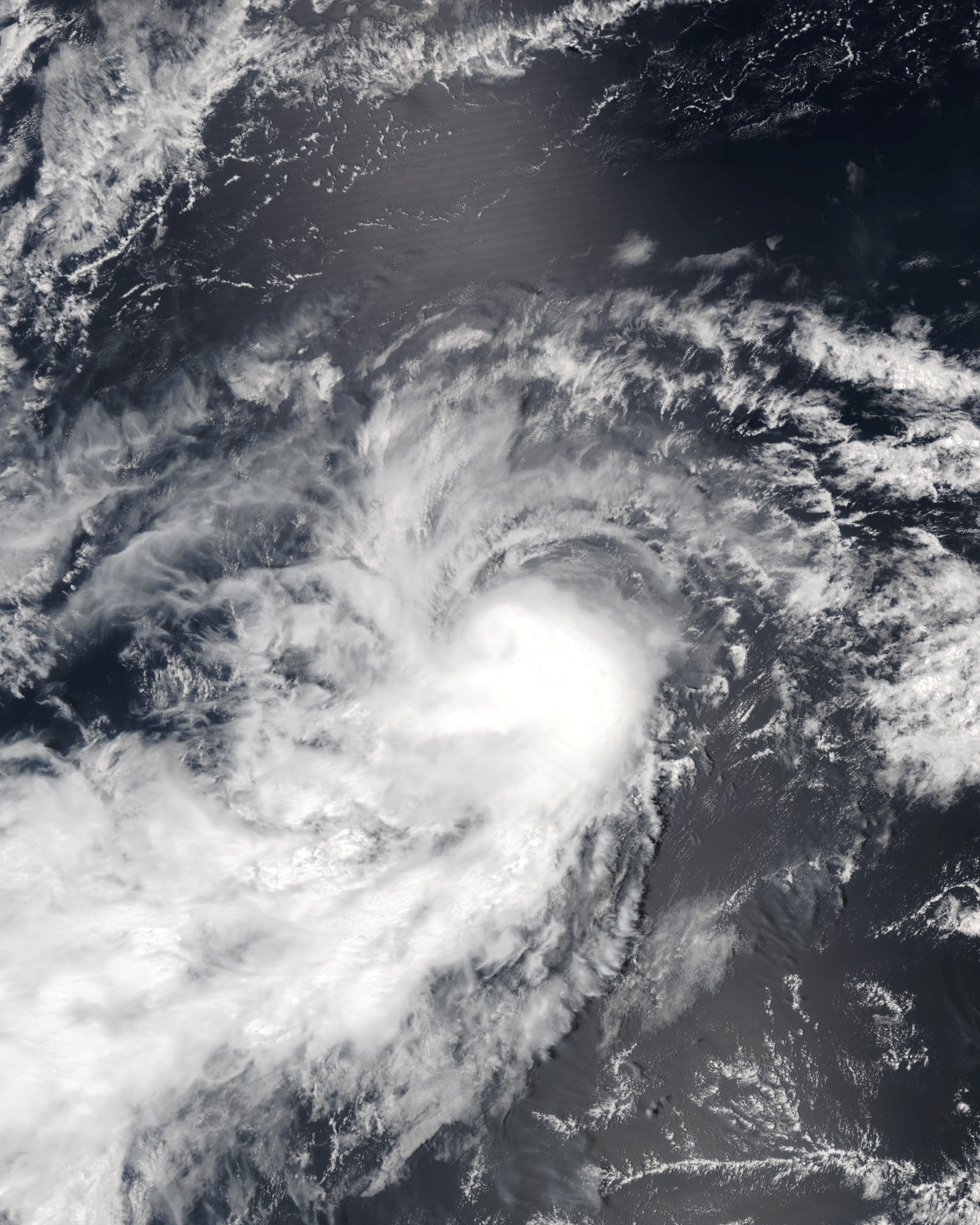
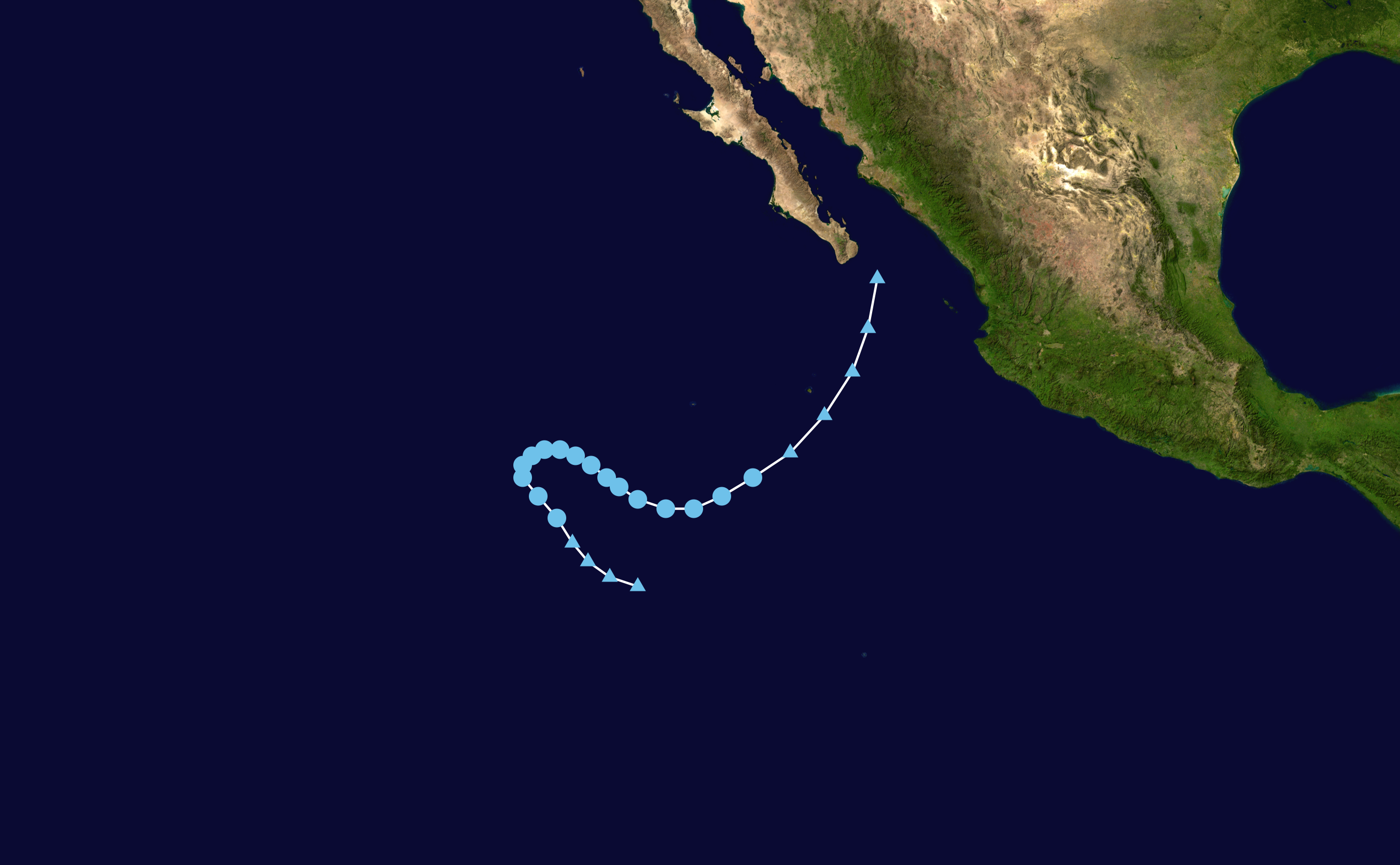
- Duration: September 11 – September 15
- Peak intensity: 35 mph (55 km/h) (1-min); 1005 mbar (hPa)

A tropical wave that cannot be traced back to Africa was first noted over the central Atlantic on August 29. It entered the East Pacific four days later, where an increase in organization led to the development of a tropical depression well southwest of Baja California around 06:00 UTC on September 11. A mid-level ridge to its east directed the newly formed system northwest to north initially, but as this ridge gradually dissipated, nearby Hurricane Odile became the dominant steering mechanism and forced the depression generally east. In close proximity to Odile, the depression was heavily sheared and thus failed to intensify into a tropical storm. It instead degenerated to a remnant low around 06:00 UTC on September 15 before weakening to an open trough the next morning.

=== Hurricane Polo ===
- Category 1 hurricane (SSHWS)
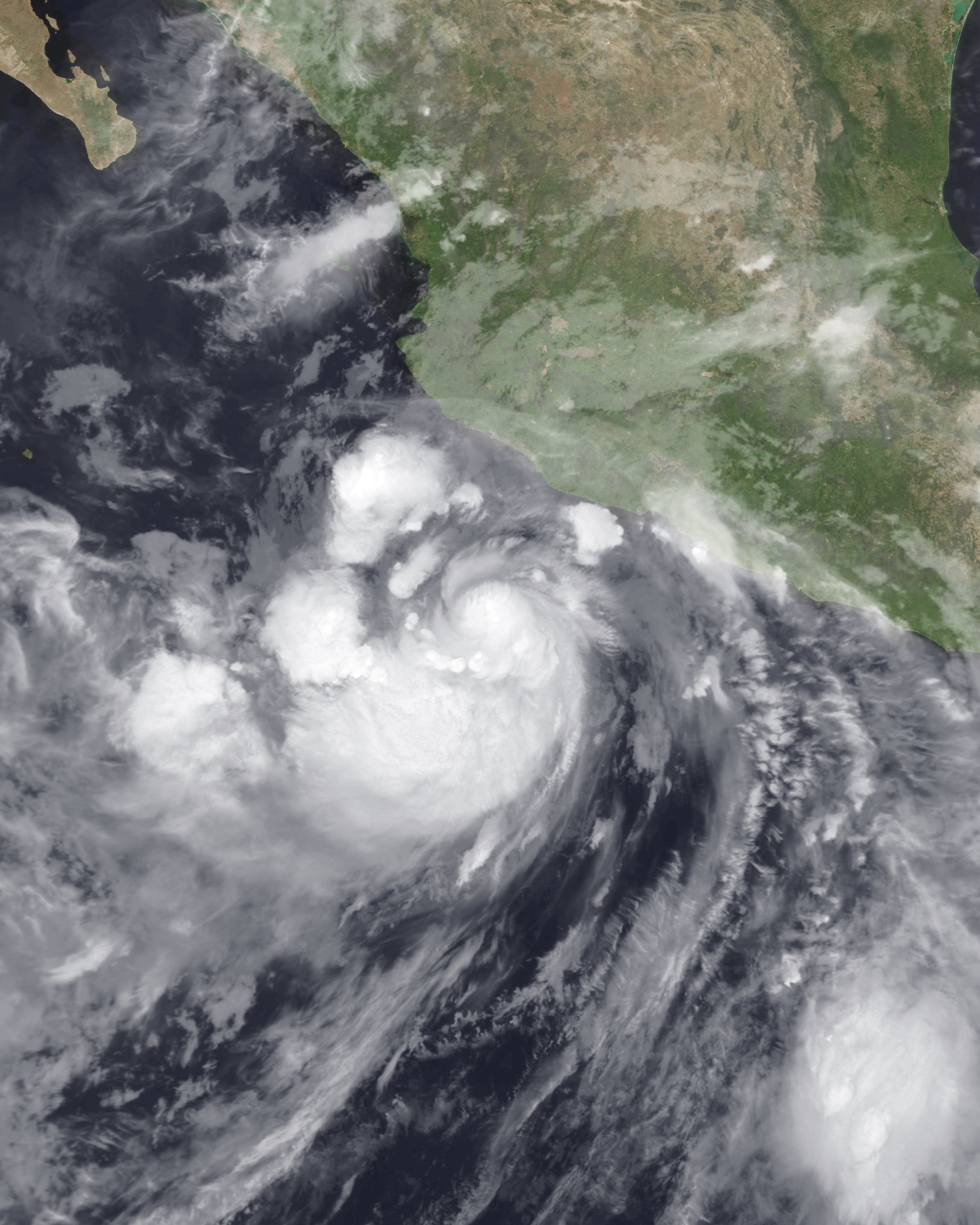
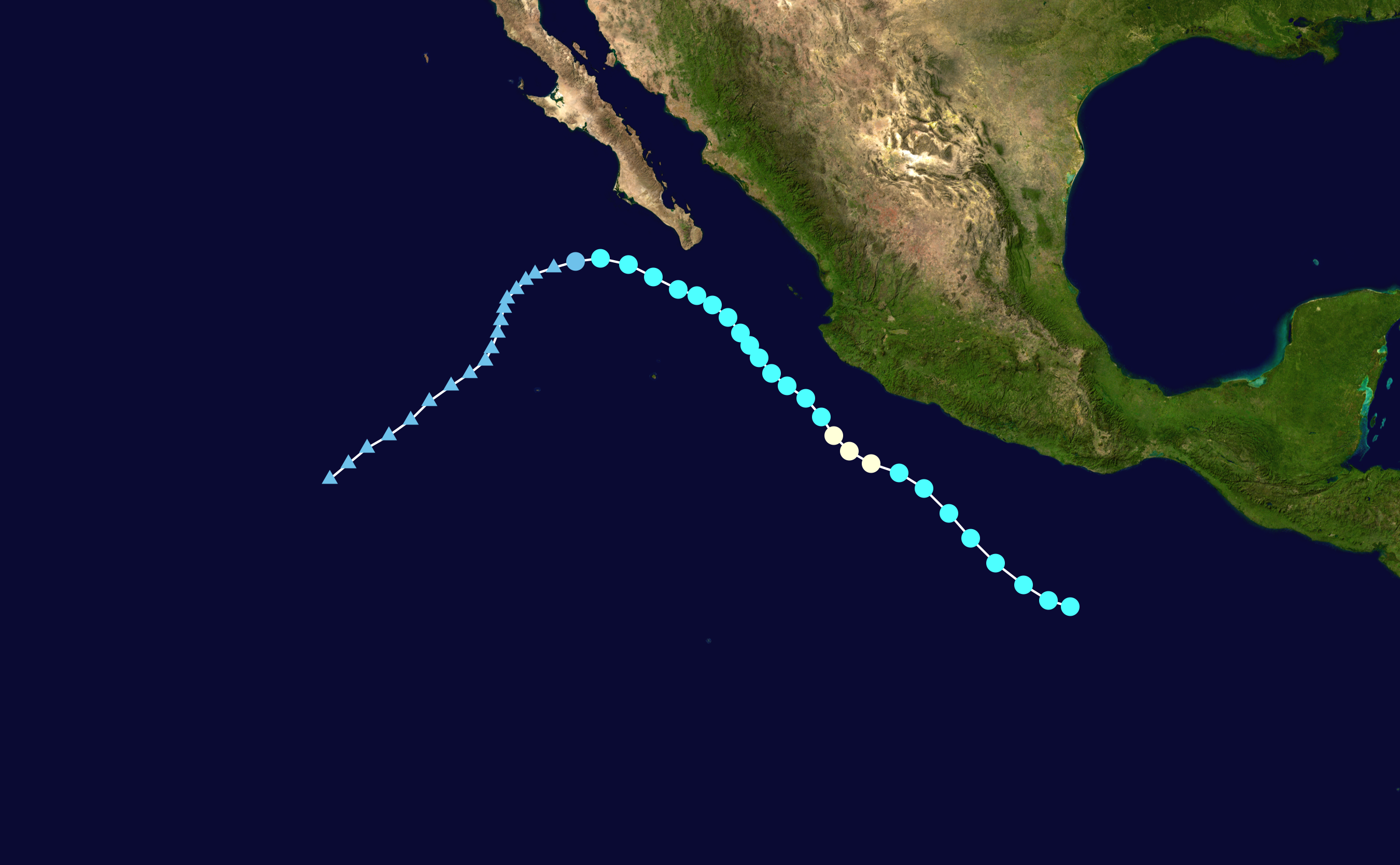
- Duration: September 16 – September 22
- Peak intensity: 75 mph (120 km/h) (1-min); 979 mbar (hPa)

The interaction of a westward-tracking tropical wave that emerged off the coast of Africa on September 4, an eastward-tracking kelvin wave, and an elongated surface trough led to the formation of Tropical Storm Polo by 00:00 UTC on September 16 about 310 mi (500 km) south of Puerto Escondido, Mexico. Tracking northwest within an environment conducive for strengthening, Polo intensified into a Category 1 hurricane and reached peak winds of 75 mph (120 km/h) by 00:00 UTC on September 18 as an eye became evident on satellite imagery. A sharp increase in wind shear quickly thereafter caused the storm's center to become exposed, and a reconnaissance mission indicated that Polo weakened to a tropical storm by 18:00 UTC that day. After maintaining intensity for about a day, the cyclone weakened to a tropical depression by 06:00 UTC on September 22 and further decreased into a remnant low six hours later. The low turned southwestward before dissipating well southwest of the southern tip of Baja California on September 26.

At 15:00 UTC on September 16, a tropical storm watch was issued for the coast of Southwestern Mexico from Zihuatanejo, Guerrero to Cabo Corrientes, Jalisco. Just 24 hours later, a tropical storm warning was put in effect Punta San Telmo, Michoacán to Playa Perula, Jalisco. One tourist perished and three others, including two fisherman, went missing in Guerrero. A total of 190 restaurants and 20 shops were damaged. Damage in the state totalled at about 100 million pesos (US$7.6 million).

=== Hurricane Rachel ===
- Category 1 hurricane (SSHWS)
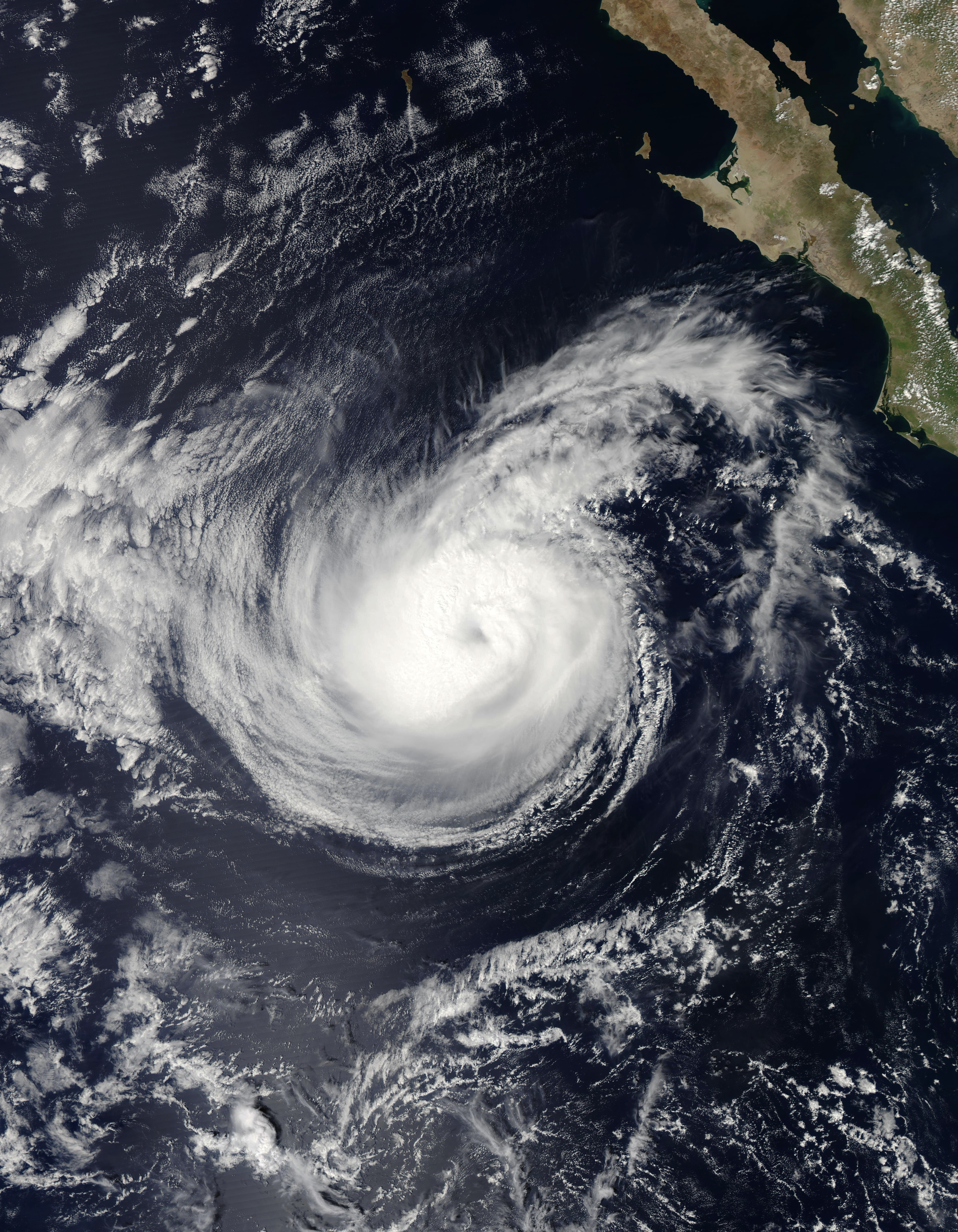
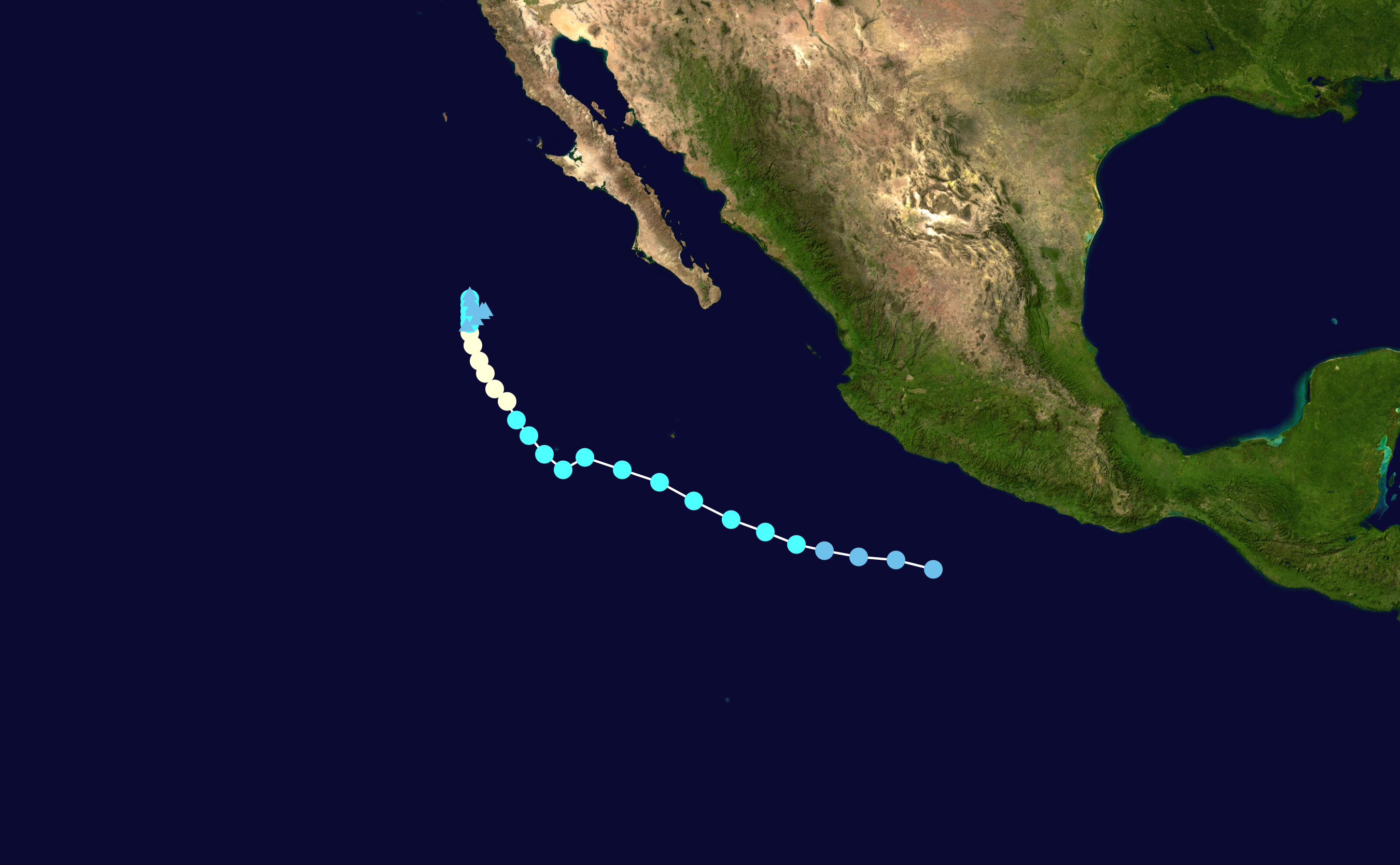
- Duration: September 24 – September 30
- Peak intensity: 85 mph (140 km/h) (1-min); 980 mbar (hPa)

A vigorous tropical wave moved off Africa on September 7, aiding in the formation of Hurricane Edouard before entering the East Pacific on September 19. There, it interacted with pre-existing southwesterly flow, eventually leading to the formation of a tropical depression around 18:00 UTC on September 23. Moderate northeast wind shear prevented the west-northwest-moving depression from becoming Tropical Storm Rachel until 00:00 UTC on September 25. The next day, Rachel's original center dissipated and a new one formed under deep convection. Environmental conditions became more favorable on September 27, when the cyclone reached hurricane strength at 18:00 UTC. It attained peak winds of 85 mph (135 km/h) six hours later before dry air, wind shear, and cooler waters caused a quick decay as the storm moved north. Rachel fell below hurricane strength around 06:00 UTC on September 29 and degenerated to a remnant low by 12:00 UTC the next morning. It dissipated early on October 3.

=== Hurricane Simon ===
- Category 4 hurricane (SSHWS)
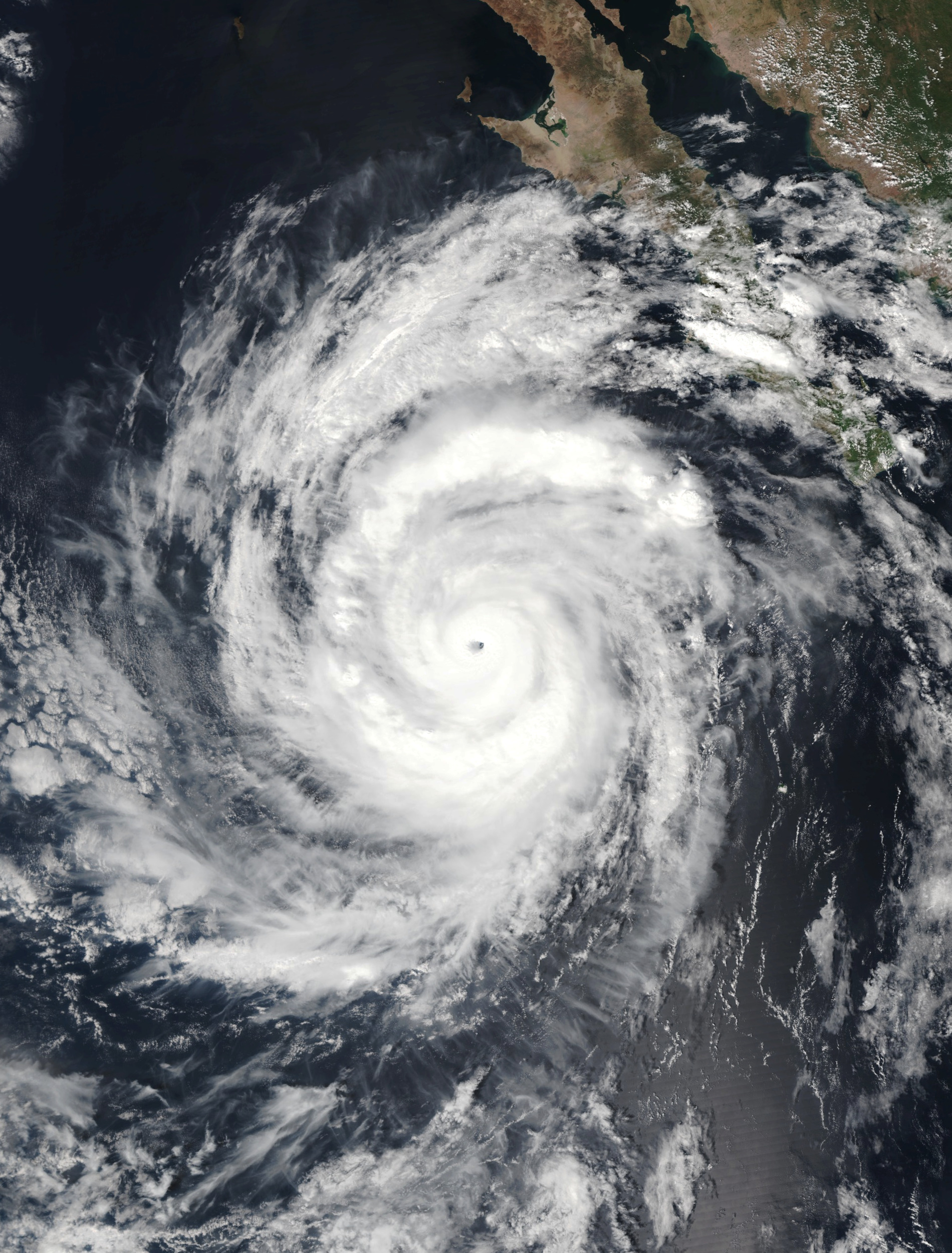
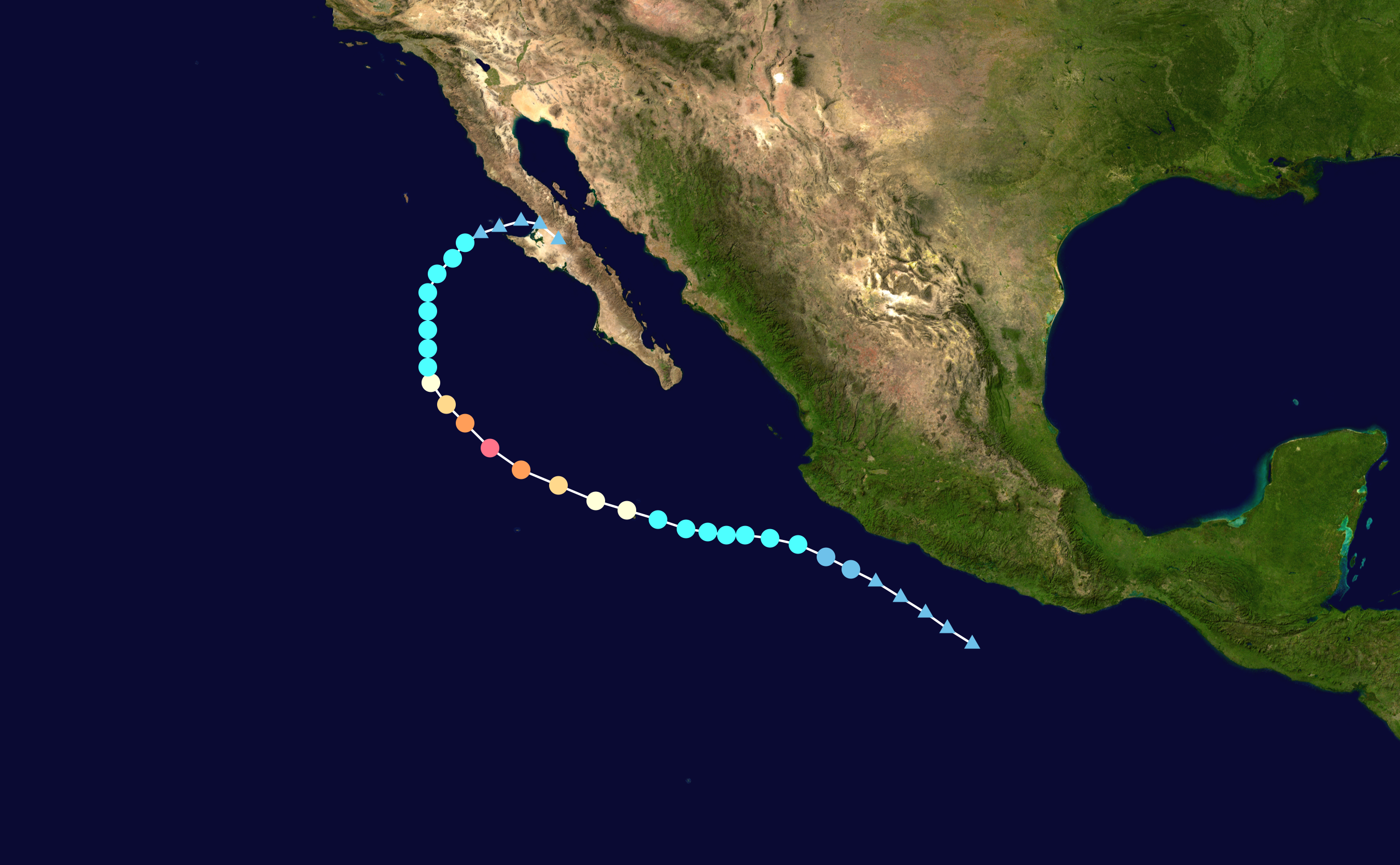
- Duration: October 1 – October 7
- Peak intensity: 130 mph (215 km/h) (1-min); 946 mbar (hPa)

A tropical wave departed Africa on September 14 and continued into the eastern Pacific ten days later, where it interacted with the ITCZ and produced a large area of convection. An area of low pressure developed within this convection and organized while moving west-northwest, becoming a tropical depression by 18:00 UTC on October 1 and intensifying into Tropical Storm Simon twelve hours later. Simon only slowly strengthened initially, limited by its broad size. However, beginning around 18:00 UTC on October 3, it began a 30-hour period of rapid intensification wherein maximum winds increased from 65 to 130 mph (105 to 210 km/h), a Category 4 hurricane. The system turned northwest around the periphery of a ridge, tracking into a region of low ocean heat content that prompted cold water upwelling. Simon rapidly weakened to a tropical storm early on October 6 before gradually degenerating to a remnant area of low pressure around 00:00 UTC on October 8. The post-tropical cyclone turned east and moved ashore Baja California Sur several hours later before dissipating over rugged terrain by 06:00 UTC the next day.

=== Hurricane Ana ===
- Category 1 hurricane (SSHWS)
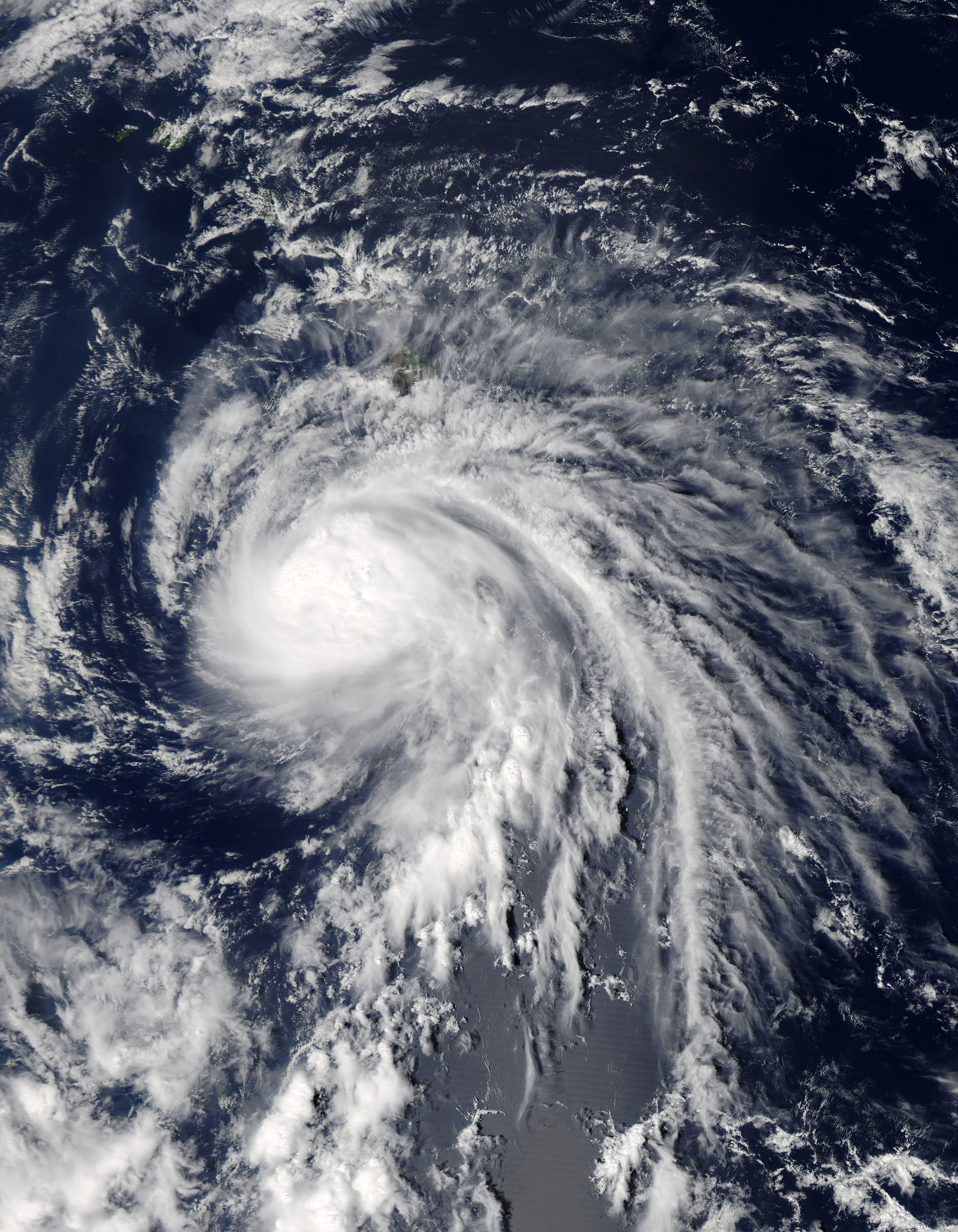
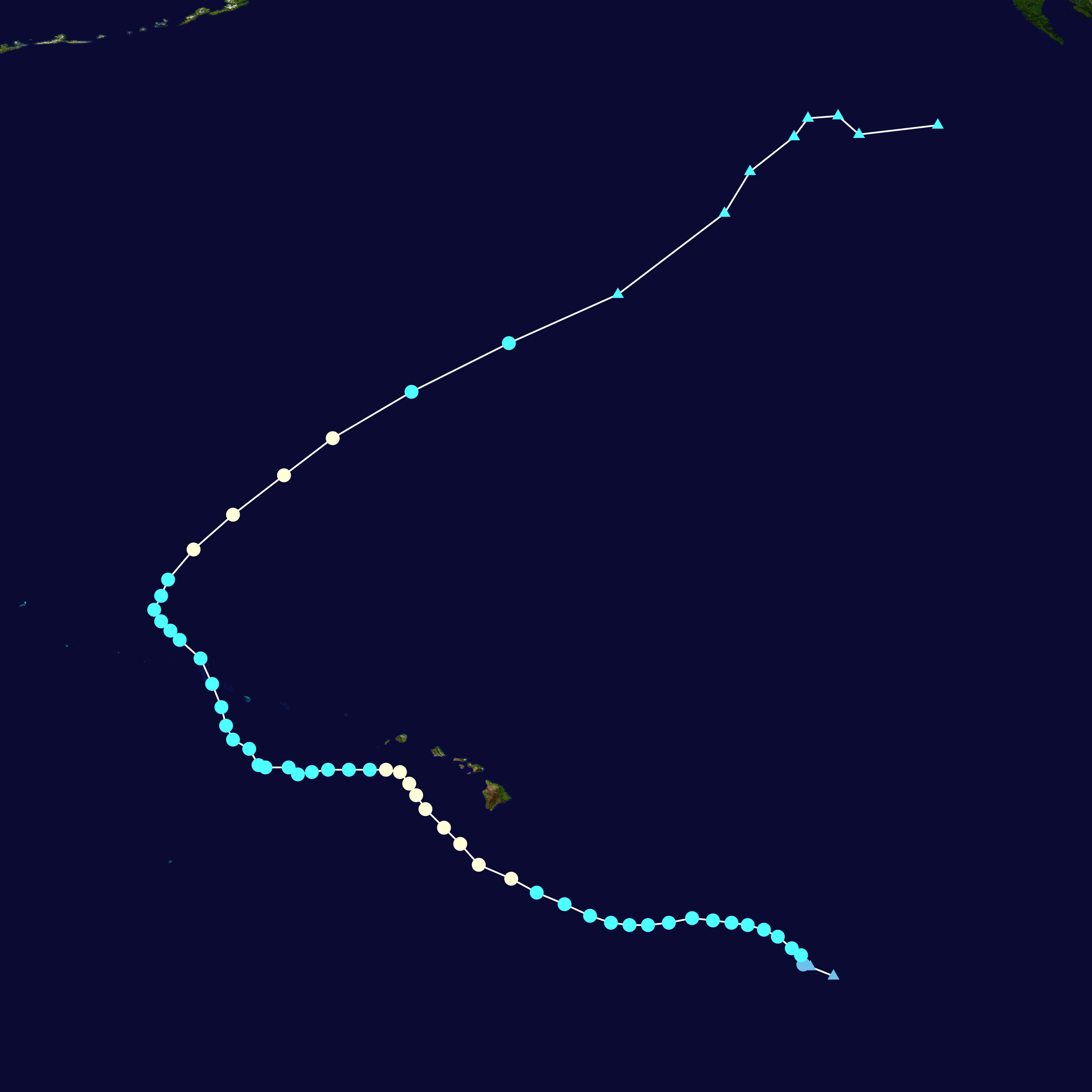
- Duration: October 13 – October 26
- Peak intensity: 85 mph (140 km/h) (1-min); 985 mbar (hPa)

In mid-October 2014, disorganized but deep convection persisted in the Central Pacific at low latitudes. By October 12, the CPHC noted the potential for tropical cyclogenesis in the vicinity of the convection. Over the next day, rapid organization occurred as an area of low pressure formed and convection became significantly better organized. Based on this, advisories were issued on Tropical Depression Two-C at 21:00 UTC. Further organization continued within the system and the cyclone was eventually upgraded to Tropical Storm Ana by the next day. A cold front that had been passing through the Central Pacific had begun to weaken a subtropical ridge to Ana's north, which allowed it to gain latitude as it moved west due to deep steering flow. Under a favorable environment with above-normal sea surface temperatures, Ana gradually intensified as it tracked northwest towards Hawaii, eventually become a hurricane by 21:00 UTC on October 17, shortly before reaching peak intensity nine hours later at 06:00 UTC on October 18 about 120 miles (190 km) southwest of the Big Island. Ana began to curve westwards, and weakening began to ensue shortly afterwards, and fell below hurricane intensity by 06:00 UTC on October 20. Ana continued to track westwards away from the Hawaiian islands, until it reached the western periphery of the subtropical ridge and as a cold front began to extend towards it. At this point, Ana had weakened to a minimal tropical storm. As it turned northeast, warm sea surface temperatures caused Ana to rapidly reorganize and strengthen, and by 03:00 UTC on October 25, Ana became a hurricane again, with a cloud-filled eye developing aside other structural improvements. As it accelerated northeast at speeds of 40 mph (64 km/h), Ana succumbed to the wind shear and weakened again to a tropical storm. By 15:00 UTC on October 26, Ana had transitioned into an extratropical cyclone. According to the CPHC, this made Ana the longest-lived and longest-tracked tropical cyclone that stayed entirely within the Central Pacific basin. Ana's extratropical remnant continued to race northeastward across the Pacific Ocean, before making landfall in British Columbia, dissipating afterward on October 28.

Beginning on October 15, various tropical cyclone warnings and watches were issued for Hawaii, starting with a tropical storm watch for the Big Island. Three days later, a tropical storm warning was issued for Kauaʻi and Niʻihau, and was extended to include portions of the Papahānaumokuākea Marine National Monument. The threat of the storm forced parks and beaches to close in the state. While passing south of Hawaii, Ana produced heavy rainfall on most of the islands, peaking at 11.67 in (296 mm) at Keaumo on the Big Island. The rains caused the Sand Island water treatment plant in Honolulu to overflow, which sent about 5,000 gallons of partially treated wastewater into Honolulu Harbor. Although no real-time wind reports of damage from Ana was reported on the Big Island, a post-storm report in November 2014 by resident Keith Robinson reported that there was damage in the southern vicinity of Niʻihau. He reported extensive vegetation damage as well as tree tops levelled at "an estimated Beaufort Wind Scale range of 40–50 mph (64–80 km/h)". Although it was not officially verified, the CPHC decided to treat the report as part of the conditions experienced in the area that was under a tropical storm warning.

=== Tropical Storm Trudy ===
- Tropical storm (SSHWS)
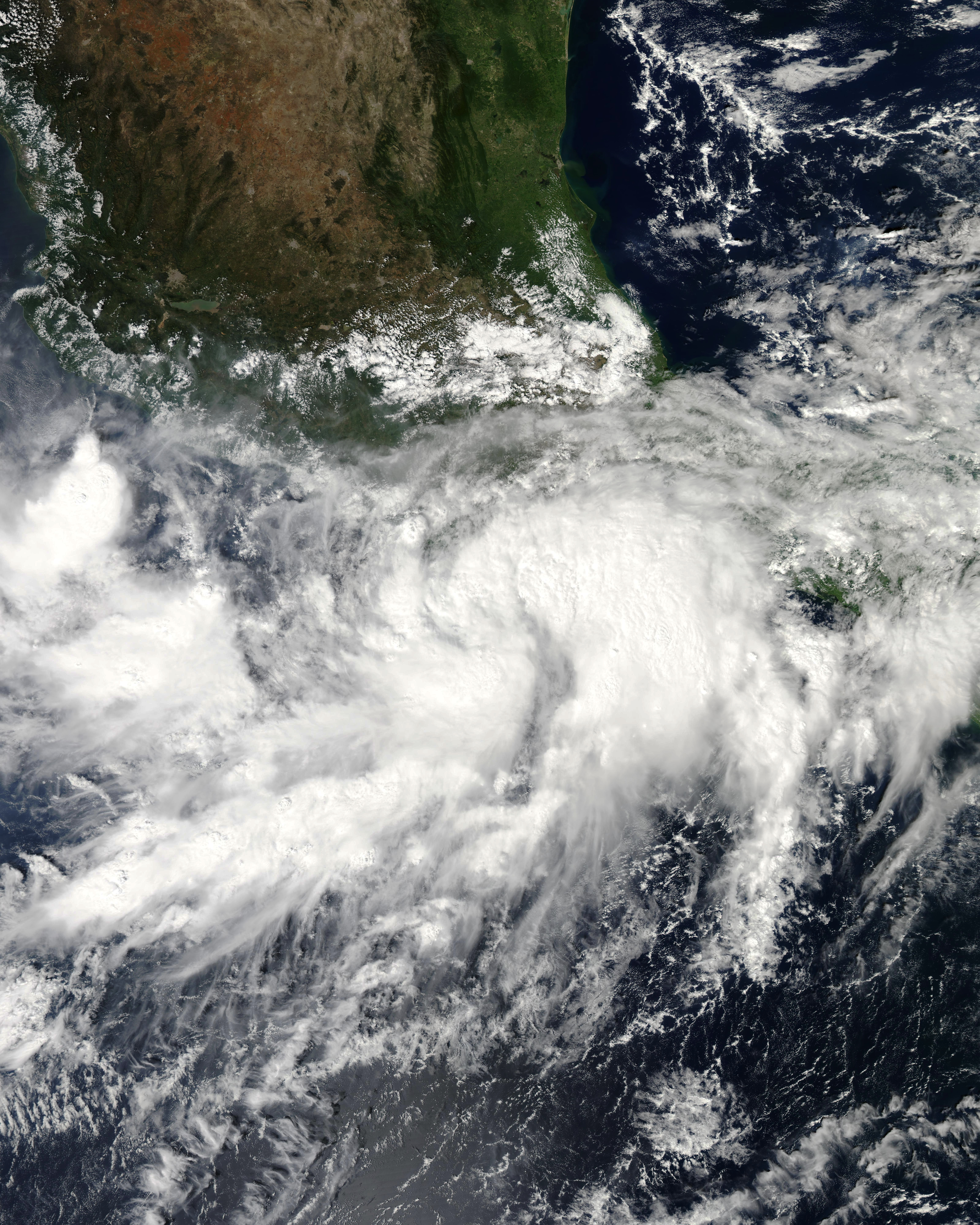
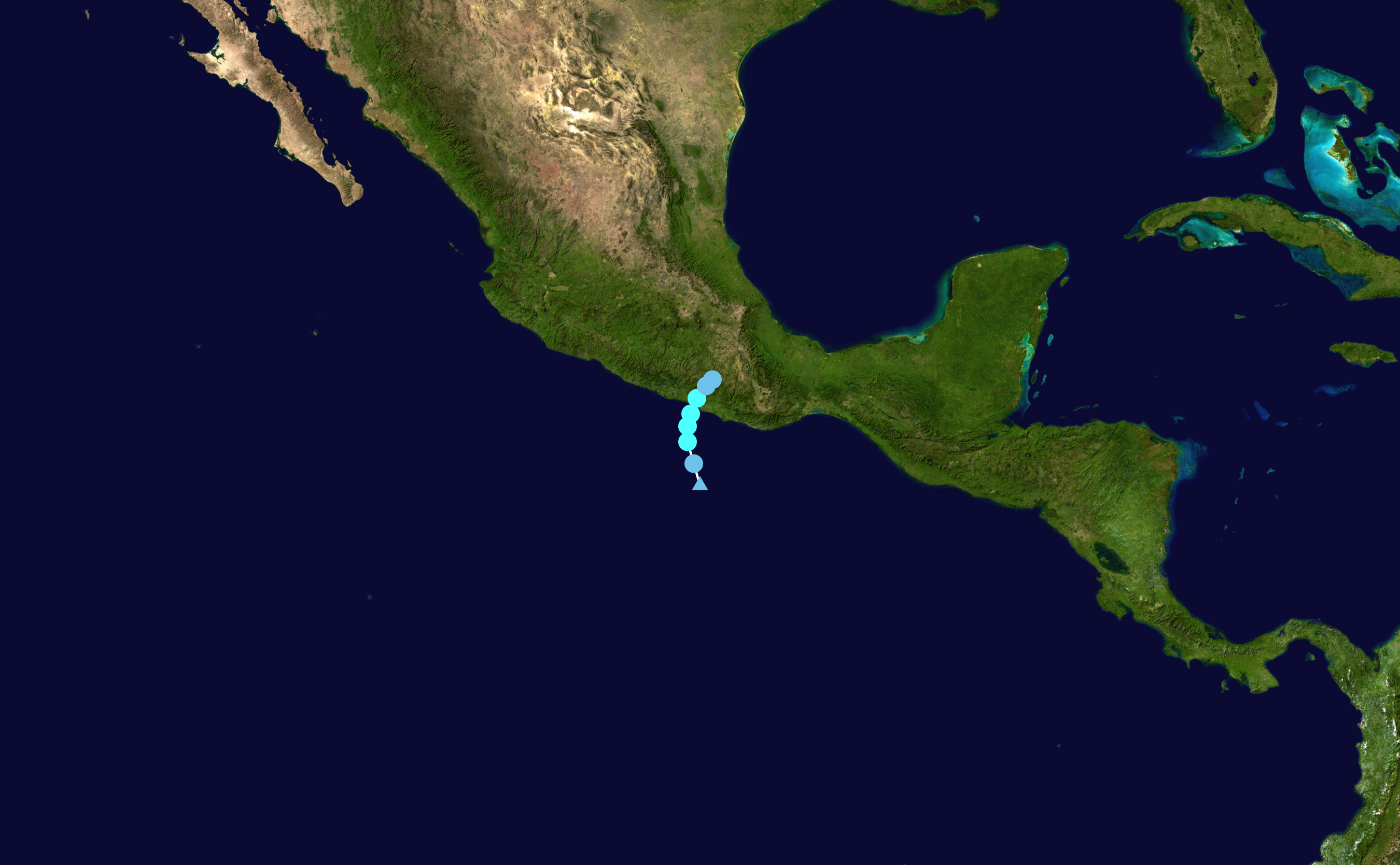
- Duration: October 17 – October 19
- Peak intensity: 65 mph (100 km/h) (1-min); 998 mbar (hPa)

A broad area of low pressure became established across the East Pacific during the first week of October. In conjunction with an eastward-moving convectively-coupled kelvin wave and a Tehuantepecer, a significant increase in convection in association with the low was observed. Following several days of consolidation, the disturbance acquired sufficient organization to be declared a tropical depression at 12:00 UTC on October 17; six hours later, it was upgraded to Tropical Storm Trudy. Amid an exceptionally favorable environment, Trudy quickly intensified as it moved north-northwestward, with the formation of an inner core and eye evident on conventional and microwave satellite imagery. At 09:15 UTC on October 18, the cyclone reached peak winds of 65 mph (105 km/h) as it moved ashore just southeast of Marquelia, Mexico. Trudy quickly weakened following landfall, weakening to a tropical depression at 18:00 UTC and dissipating by 06:00 UTC on October 19, while located over the mountains of southern Mexico. Trudy's remnant energy continued across Mexico and contributed to the development of Tropical Storm Hanna/Tropical Depression Nine on October 21, 2014.

In preparation for the cyclone, various tropical cyclone watches and warnings were issued for the coastline of southeastern Mexico. A "yellow" alert was initially activated for Guerrero; however, following Trudy's period of rapid intensification, this was abruptly upgraded to a "red" alert for southeastern portions of the state as well as southwestern Oaxaca, and the remainder of the two states were placed under an "orange" alert. Upon making landfall, torrential rainfall associated with the cyclone caused numerous landslides and flooding. Approximately 4,075 people were evacuated from the most-at-risk locations. A total of 5,000 homes were affected by the storm, 218 of which damaged and an additional six completely destroyed. At the height of the storm, more than 20,000 households were without electricity. A state of emergency was declared for 35 municipalities across Guerrero and 100 municipalities in Oaxaca. Overall, Trudy was responsible for nine deaths: eight in Guerrero and one in Campeche.

=== Hurricane Vance ===
- Category 2 hurricane (SSHWS)
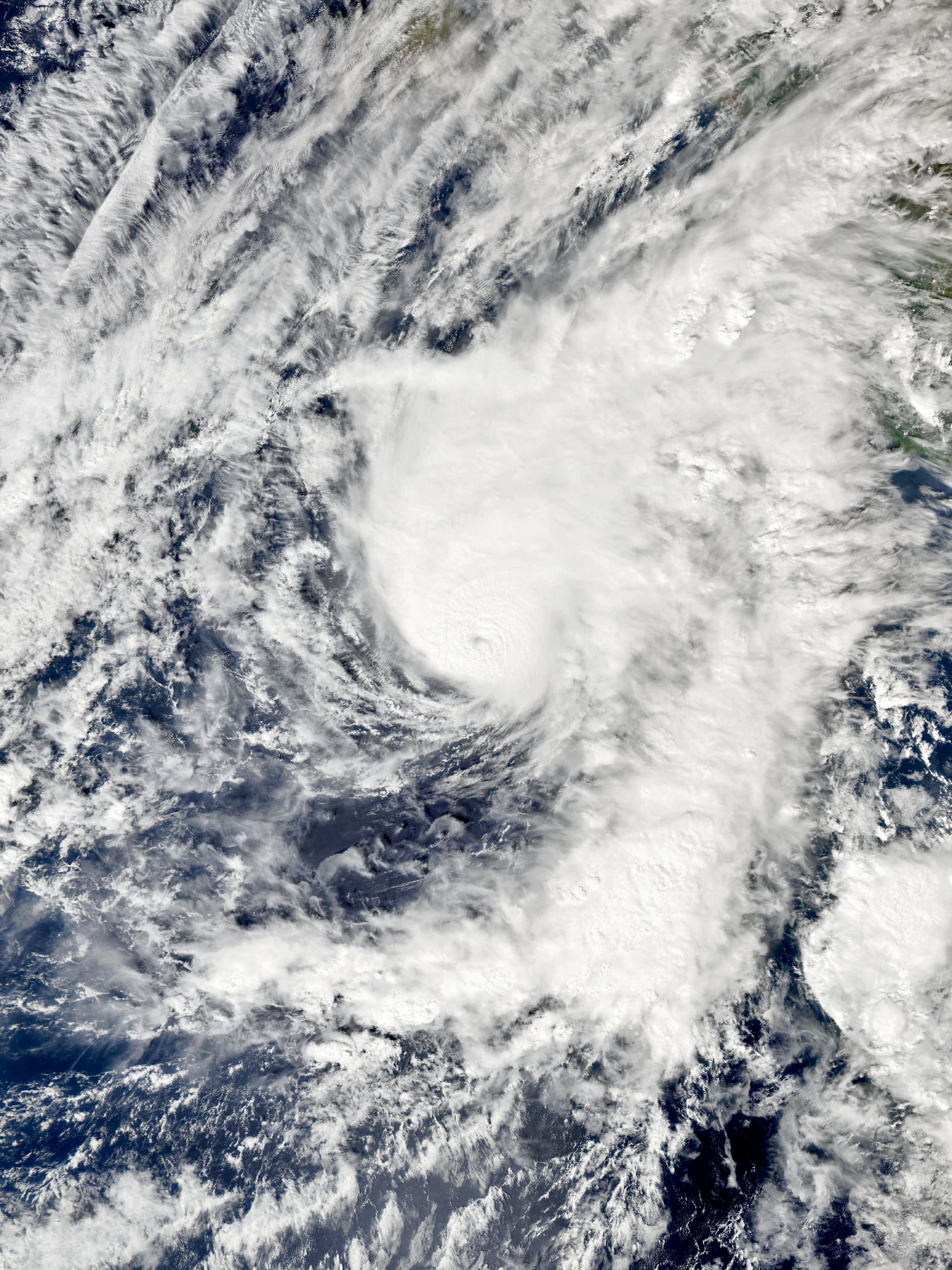
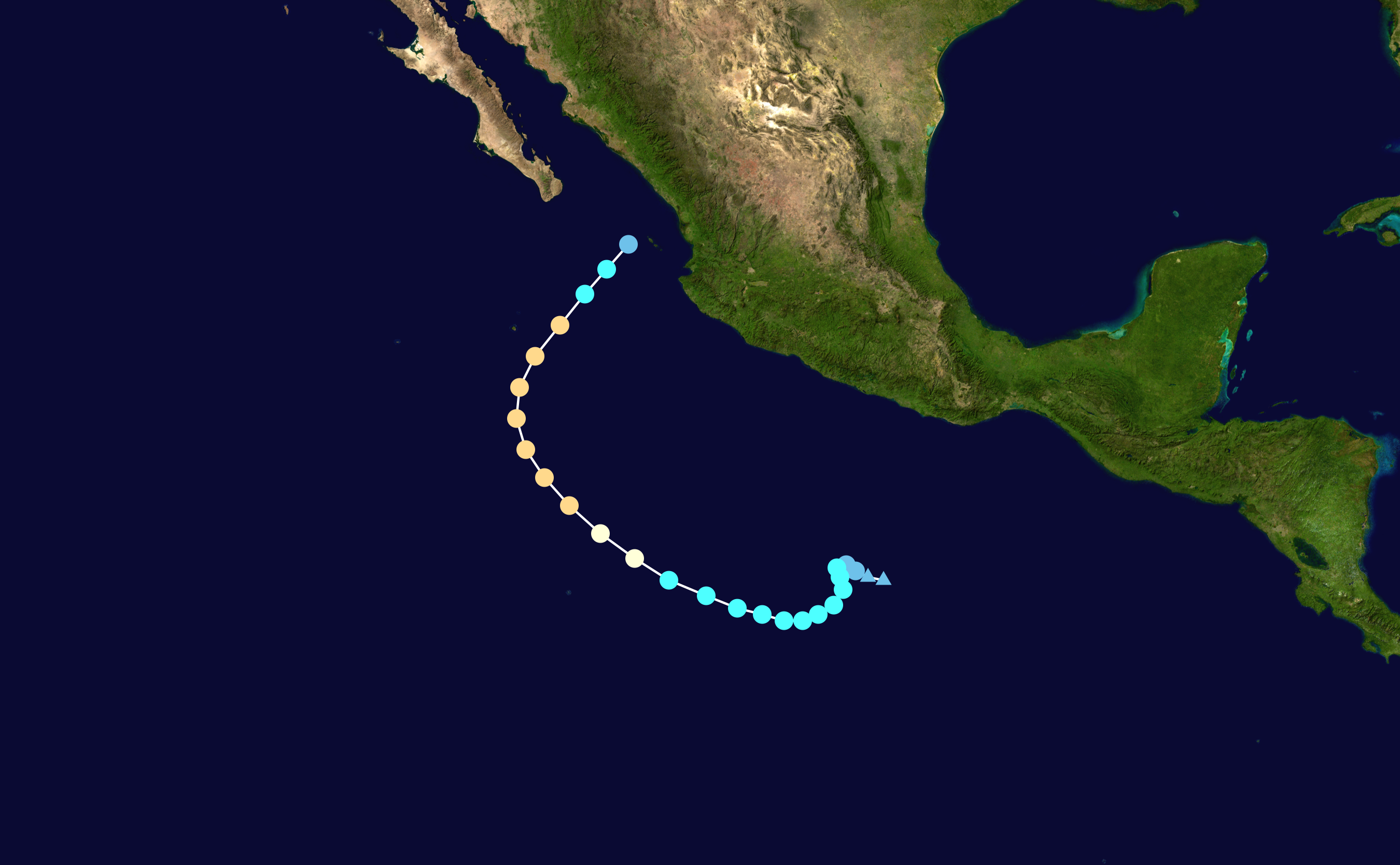
- Duration: October 30 – November 5
- Peak intensity: 110 mph (175 km/h) (1-min); 964 mbar (hPa)

A trough that extended from the Atlantic's Tropical Storm Hanna into the eastern Pacific led to widespread convection south of the Gulf of Tehuantepec in late October. This disturbance remained disorganized until 06:00 UTC on October 30, when a well-defined center and organized thunderstorm activity led to the formation of a tropical depression. The cyclone intensified into Tropical Storm Vance twelve hours later but ultimately weakened some due to the entrainment of dry air. After drifting for a day, mid-level ridging over the far eastern Pacific caused the storm to move west-northwest. Improving environmental conditions allowed it to become a hurricane around 12:00 UTC on November 2 and rapidly strengthen to a Category 2 with winds of 110 mph (175 km/h) the next day. Vance curved northeast into a higher shear environment by November 4, causing the system to weaken from a Category 2 hurricane to a tropical depression in an 18-hour period. The depression opened up into a trough around 12:00 UTC on November 5 and moved ashore Sinaloa and Nayarit several hours later before dissipating.

Heavy rains from the remnants of Vance, lasting 40 hours in some places, damaged 2,490 homes across 7 municipalities in the Mexican state of Durango. Flooding up to 1 m (3.3 ft) in depth affected ten homes in San Dimas. Thirty families in the area were evacuated due to the rising water. A few landslides were reported in the region, though no major damage resulted.

== Storm names ==
The following list of names was used for named storms that formed in the North Pacific Ocean east of 140°W during 2014. This is the same list used in the 2008 season, with the exception of Amanda, which replaced Alma. The name Amanda was used for the first time this year.

- Amanda
- Boris
- Cristina
- Douglas
- Elida
- Fausto
- Genevieve *
- Hernan
- Iselle *
- Julio *
- Karina
- Lowell
- Marie
- Norbert
- Odile
- Polo
- Rachel
- Simon
- Trudy
- Vance
- Winnie (unused)
- Xavier (unused)
- Yolanda (unused)
- Zeke (unused)

For storms that form in the North Pacific from 140°W to the International Date Line, the names come from a series of four rotating lists. Names are used one after the other without regard to year, and when the bottom of one list is reached, the next named storm receives the name at the top of the next list. Two named storms, listed below, formed within the area in 2014. Also, named storms in the table above that crossed into the area during the season are noted (*).

- Wali
- Ana

=== Retirement ===
On April 17, 2015, at the 37th session of the RA IV hurricane committee of the World Meteorological Organization (WMO) retired the name Odile from its rotating name lists due to the damage and loss of life it caused, and it will not be used again in the Eastern Pacific basin. Odile was replaced with Odalys for the 2020 season. The WMO also removed the name Isis from its place in the rotation, deeming its continued use as a storm name inappropriate because it had become associated with the Islamic extremist militant group known widely as ISIS. The name Ivette was chosen to replace it in the 2016 season.

== Season effects ==
This is a table of all of the tropical cyclones that formed in the 2014 Pacific hurricane season. It includes their name, duration (within the basin), peak classification and intensities, areas affected, damage, and death totals. Deaths in parentheses are additional and indirect (an example of an indirect death would be a traffic accident), but were still related to that storm. Damage and deaths include totals while the storm was extratropical, a wave, or a low, and all of the damage figures are in 2014 USD.

Saffir–Simpson scale
| TD | TS | C1 | C2 | C3 | C4 | C5 |

2014 Pacific hurricane season statistics
| Storm name | Dates active | Storm category at peak intensity | Max 1-min wind mph (km/h) | Min. press. (mbar) | Areas affected | Damage (US$) | Deaths | Ref(s). |
|---|---|---|---|---|---|---|---|---|
| Amanda | May 22–29 | Category 4 hurricane | 155 (250) | 932 | Southwestern Mexico, Western Mexico | Minimal | 3 | |
| Boris | June 2–4 | Tropical storm | 45 (75) | 998 | Southwestern Mexico, Guatemala | $54.1 million | 6 | |
| Cristina | June 9–15 | Category 4 hurricane | 150 (240) | 935 | Southwestern Mexico, Western Mexico | Minimal | None | |
| Douglas | June 28 – July 5 | Tropical storm | 50 (85) | 999 | None | None | None | |
| Elida | June 30 – July 2 | Tropical storm | 50 (85) | 1002 | Western Mexico | None | None | |
| Fausto | July 7–9 | Tropical storm | 45 (75) | 1004 | None | None | None | |
| Wali | July 17–18 | Tropical storm | 45 (75) | 1003 | Hawaii | Minimal | (1) | |
| Genevieve | July 25 – August 7 (Note: Genevieve did not dissipate on August 7. It crossed the International Date Line, beyond which point it was then referred to as Typhoon Genevieve.) | Category 3 hurricane | 115 (185) | 965 | None (before crossover) | None | None | |
| Hernan | July 26–29 | Category 1 hurricane | 75 (120) | 992 | None | None | None | |
| Iselle | July 31 – August 9 | Category 4 hurricane | 140 (220) | 947 | Hawaii | >$148 million | 1 | |
| Julio | August 4–15 | Category 3 hurricane | 120 (195) | 960 | Hawaii | None | None | |
| Karina | August 13–26 | Category 1 hurricane | 85 (140) | 983 | None | None | None | |
| Lowell | August 17–24 | Category 1 hurricane | 75 (120) | 980 | None | None | None | |
| Marie | August 22–28 | Category 5 hurricane | 160 (260) | 918 | Southwestern Mexico, Southern California | $20 million | 6 | |
| Norbert | September 2–7 | Category 3 hurricane | 125 (205) | 950 | Western Mexico, Baja California Peninsula, Southwestern United States | $28.3 million | 5 | |
| Odile | September 10–18 | Category 4 hurricane | 140 (220) | 918 | Western Mexico, Baja California Peninsula, Northwestern Mexico, Southwestern United States, Texas | $1.82 billion | 18 | |
| Sixteen-E | September 11–15 | Tropical depression | 35 (55) | 1005 | Baja California Sur | None | None | |
| Polo | September 16–22 | Category 1 hurricane | 75 (120) | 979 | Western Mexico, Baja California Peninsula | $7.6 million | 1 | |
| Rachel | September 24–30 | Category 1 hurricane | 85 (140) | 980 | None | None | None | |
| Simon | October 1–7 | Category 4 hurricane | 130 (215) | 946 | Western Mexico, Baja California Peninsula, Southwestern United States | Unknown | None | |
| Ana | October 13–26 | Category 1 hurricane | 85 (140) | 985 | Hawaii, Western Canada, Alaskan Panhandle | Minimal | None | |
| Trudy | October 17–19 | Tropical storm | 65 (100) | 998 | Southwestern Mexico | >$12.3 million | 9 | |
| Vance | October 30 – November 5 | Category 2 hurricane | 110 (175) | 964 | Western Mexico, Northwestern Mexico | Minimal | None | |
Season aggregates
| 23 systems | May 22 – November 5 | | 160 (260) | 918 | | ≥$2.09 billion | 50 | |

== See also ==
- Tropical cyclones in 2014
- List of Pacific hurricanes
- Pacific hurricane season
- 2014 Atlantic hurricane season
- 2014 Pacific typhoon season
- 2014 North Indian Ocean cyclone season
- South-West Indian Ocean cyclone seasons: 2013–14, 2014–15
- Australian region cyclone seasons: 2013–14, 2014–15
- South Pacific cyclone seasons: 2013–14, 2014–15
