= List of storms named Karina =

The name Karina has been used for four tropical cyclones in the East Pacific Ocean, replacing Kenna on the naming lists:

- Tropical Storm Karina (2008) – weak tropical storm that stayed at sea
- Hurricane Karina (2014) – a Category 1 hurricane that did not affect land
- Tropical Storm Karina (2020) – did not affect land
- Hurricane Karina (2026) – a Category 4 hurricane that moved into the Central Pacific

== See also ==
- Tropical Storm Karine (1968) – a South-West Indian Ocean tropical cyclone with a similar name
