= List of storms named Kenna =

The name Kenna was used for three tropical cyclones in the East Pacific Ocean:

- Tropical Storm Kenna (1984) – remained well out at sea
- Hurricane Kenna (1990) – a Category 1 hurricane that did not affect land
- Hurricane Kenna (2002) – a Category 5 hurricane that made landfall near San Blas, Mexico

The name Kenna was retired after the 2002 season and replaced with Karina.

== See also ==
- Cyclone Keila (2011) – a North Indian Ocean tropical cyclone with a similar name
