= 2026 Pacific hurricane season =

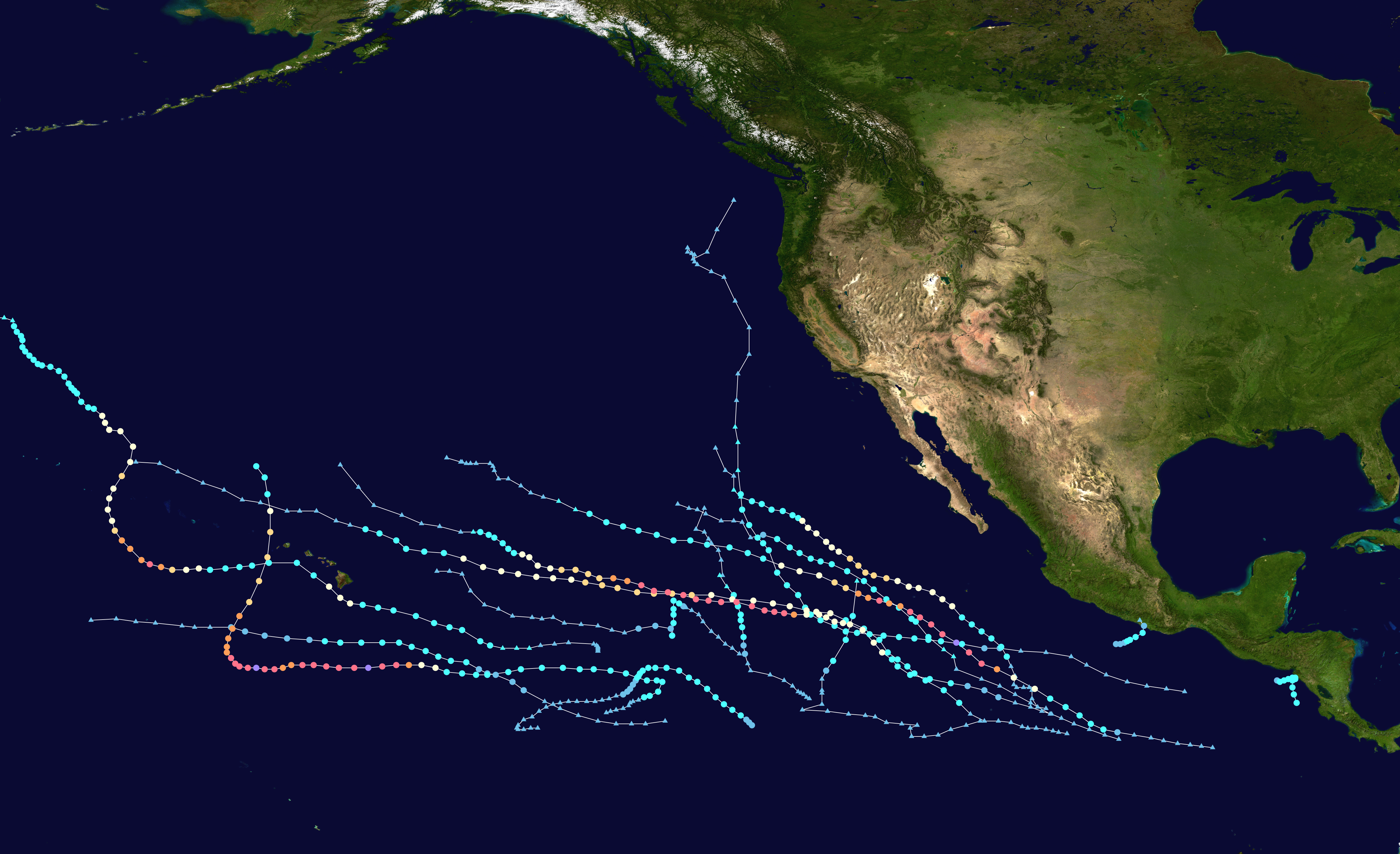
- Season summary map

Seasonal boundaries
- First system formed: June 2, 2026
- Last system dissipated: Season ongoing

Strongest storm
- Name: Polo (Second-most intense Pacific hurricane on record)
  - Maximum winds: 180 mph (285 km/h) (1-minute sustained)
  - Lowest pressure: 892 mbar (hPa; 26.34 inHg)

Seasonal statistics
- Total depressions: 26
- Total storms: 25
- Hurricanes: 13
- Major hurricanes (Cat. 3+): 11 (record high, tied with 2015)
- ACE: 359.5 (record high)
- Total fatalities: 41 total
- Total damage: > $1.81 billion (2026 USD)

Related articles
- Timeline of the 2026 Pacific hurricane season; 2026 Atlantic hurricane season; 2026 Pacific typhoon season; 2026 North Indian Ocean cyclone season

The 2026 Pacific hurricane season is the current Pacific hurricane season in the Northern Hemisphere. The season officially began on May 15, 2026, and will end on November 30, 2026. For the Central Pacific (140°W to 180°), the season began on June 1, 2026, and will end on November 30, 2026, with the most active period typically occurring between July and October. Those dates, adopted by convention, describe the period in which most tropical cyclogenesis occurs in the Pacific Ocean. This season has produced the highest accumulated cyclone energy value on record in the basin, surpassing the 2018 season. With three Category 5 Pacific hurricanes having formed this season, it is tied with the 1994, 2002, and 2018 seasons as the season with the most Category 5 hurricanes, and with eleven major hurricanes, it is tied with 2015 as the season with the most major hurricanes.

The first system of the season, Tropical Storm Amanda, formed in the open eastern Pacific on June 2. In July, Hurricane Fausto became the first hurricane, while Hurricane Genevieve became the first major hurricane, and first Category 5 hurricane, of the season. In August, Hurricane Lala became the first hurricane to directly hit the Big Island of Hawaii since 1871 while also becoming Hawaii's third-wettest tropical cyclone on record. In September, Lowell became the second Category 5 hurricane of the season and the first hurricane to directly impact Kauaʻi County since Hurricane Iniki in 1992. Later that month, Hurricane Polo became the record-tying third Category 5 hurricane of the season and the second-most-intense Pacific hurricane by central pressure on record.

== Seasonal forecasts ==
Record		Named storms	Hurricanes	Major hurricanes	ACE	Ref
Average (1991–2020)		15.4	8.3	4.2	100.5	
Record high activity		27	16†	11‡	359.5‡	
Record low activity		8†	3	0†	22.3	
Date	Source	Named storms	Hurricanes	Major hurricanes	ACE	Ref
April 22, 2026	SMN	18–21	9–11	4–5	N/A	
May 21, 2026	NOAA	15–22	9–14	5–9	N/A	
Area		Named storms	Hurricanes	Major hurricanes	ACE	Ref
Actual activity:	EPAC	20	10	8	247.5	
Actual activity:	CPAC	8	5	3	112.0	
Actual combined activity:		25	13	11	359.5	
* May 15–November 30 only ‡ New or tied record for activity or intensity † Most recent of several such occurrences. (See all) Note that the central and eastern Pacific activity counts for tropical storms and hurricanes add up to more than the season totals due to overlaps resulting from systems that reached each respective category in both the central and eastern Pacific basins

In advance of each Pacific hurricane season, forecasts of hurricane activity are issued by forecasters from the United States National Oceanic and Atmospheric Administration (NOAA)'s Climate Prediction Center, and Mexico's Servicio Meteorológico Nacional (SMN). The forecasts include weekly and monthly changes in significant factors that help determine the amount of tropical storms, hurricanes, and major hurricanes within a particular season.

According to NOAA, the average Pacific hurricane season between 1991 and 2020 contained about 15 named storms, 8 hurricanes, and 4 major hurricanes (Category 3 and higher), as well as a median accumulated cyclone energy (ACE) index of 75.38–110.55 units. Broadly speaking, ACE is the measure of the power of a tropical or subtropical cyclone multiplied by the length of time it existed. ACE is only calculated for full advisories on specific tropical or subtropical cyclones reaching wind speeds of 39 mph (63 km/h) or higher. NOAA typically describes a season as above-average, average, or below-average depending on the cumulative ACE index, but the number of tropical storms, hurricanes or major hurricanes can also be considered.

On April 22, 2026, Mexico's National Meteorological Service (SMN) issued its forecast for the Pacific hurricane season, predicting an above-average season with 18–21 named storms, 9–11 hurricanes and 4–5 major hurricanes. On May 21, 2026, NOAA issued its forecast, also calling for an above-average season with 15–22 named storms, 9–14 hurricanes, and 5–9 major hurricanes. NOAA forecasted that these elevated numbers would materialize due to a strong El Niño event during the season.

== Seasonal summary ==
Most intense Pacific hurricane seasons
Rank	Season	ACE value
1	2026	359.5
2	2018	318.1
3	1992	294.6
4	2015	290.6
5	1990	249.5
6	1978	207.7
7	1983	206.2
8	2014	202.4
9	1993	201.8
10	1984	193.7

Hurricanes Lowell (left), Karina (center) and Marie (right) on September 3

Hurricanes Nolo (left), Odalys (center), and Polo (center-right), with the disturbances that later became Rachel (far right) and Nineteen-E (southeast of Nolo) on September 25

Officially, the 2026 Pacific hurricane season began on May 15 in the Eastern Pacific, on June 1 in the Central Pacific, and both will end on November 30. Altogether, twenty-six tropical cyclones have formed, twenty-two in the Eastern Pacific and four in the Central Pacific, and all but one became named storms. Thirteen of the storms strengthened into hurricanes, with eleven of them intensifying into major hurricanes (Category 3 or higher in the Saffir–Simpson scale).

The accumulated cyclone energy (ACE) index within the eastern Pacific Ocean, officially calculated by the National Hurricane Center (NHC), is 247.5 units, the second-highest value on record, after 1992, while the index within the Central Pacific Ocean is 112.0 units, the third-highest on record. The total over the two basins, as of November 12, is 359.5 units, which is the highest accumulated cyclone energy value recorded in the basin.

The Pacific hurricane season had an exceptionally strong start, with three named systems developing by early June—the most active opening to a season in the basin since 1985. On June 2, Tropical Storm Amanda formed in the open Pacific, becoming the first tropical cyclone of the season. Five days later, Tropical Storm Boris formed off the southwestern coast of Mexico, followed by Tropical Storm Cristina the next day off the Pacific coast of Nicaragua. Boris caused damage in southern Mexico while Cristina brought torrential rain throughout Central America. In early July, Tropical Storm Douglas formed in the open Pacific, without affecting any land. Tropical Storm Fausto formed on July 19 and subsequently became the first hurricane of the season; Fausto crossed into the central Pacific a week later. On July 24, Hurricane Genevieve formed near the coast of Mexico and, a few days later, became the first major hurricane of the season. Genevieve ultimately became the first Category 5 hurricane in the basin since Kristy in 2024.

In September, Hurricane Lowell became the first Pacific hurricane to reach Category 5 intensity twice since Hurricane Ioke in 2006. Later that month, Hurricane Polo not only repeated that feat but also reached Category 5 a third time, a first for Pacific hurricanes. It also became the second-most-intense Pacific hurricane ever recorded, after Hurricane Patricia, with a pressure of 892 mbar (26.34 inHg), and accumulated the longest total time at Category 5 intensity of any Pacific hurricane.

== Systems ==
=== Tropical Storm Amanda ===
- Tropical storm (SSHWS)
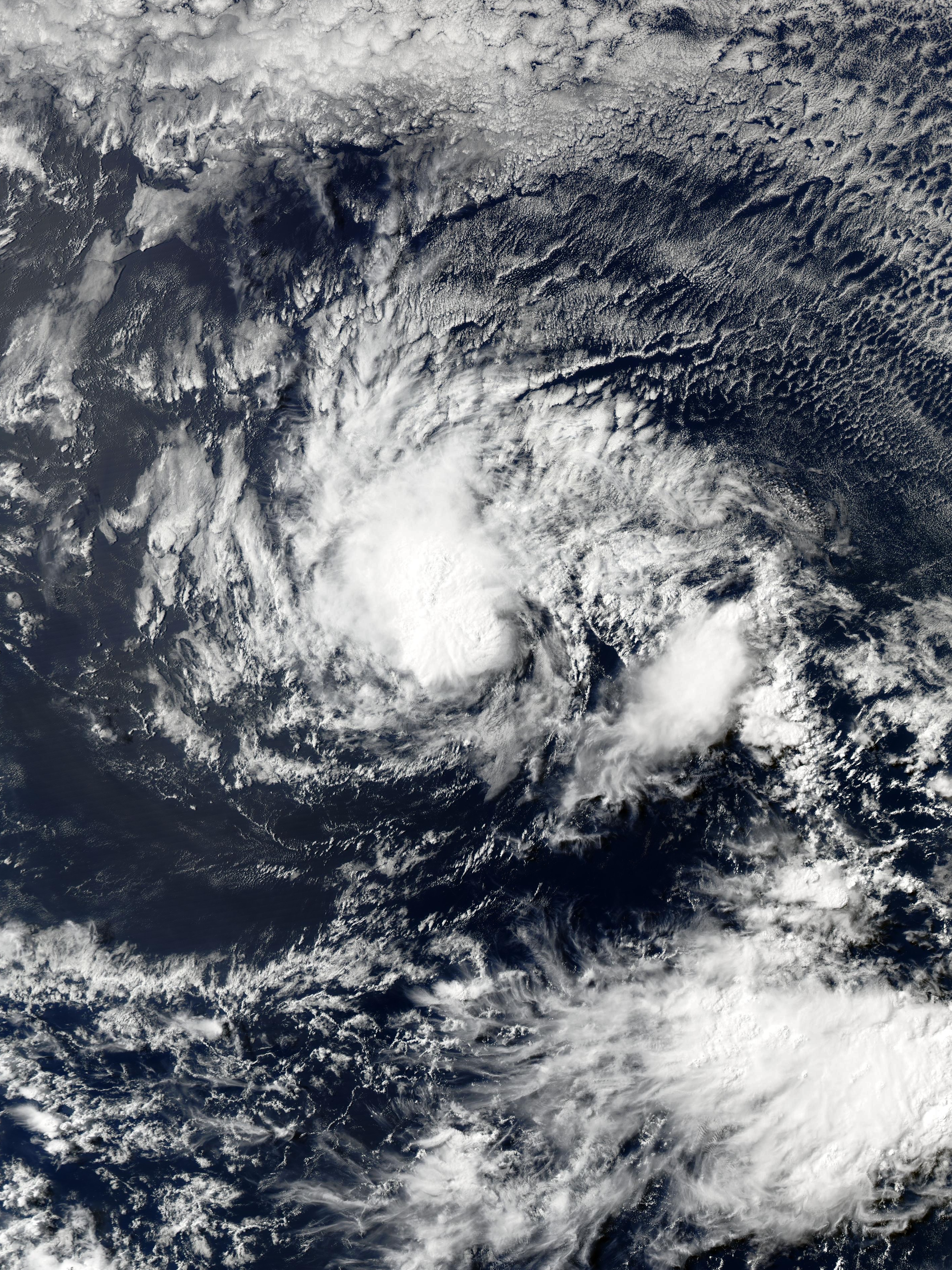
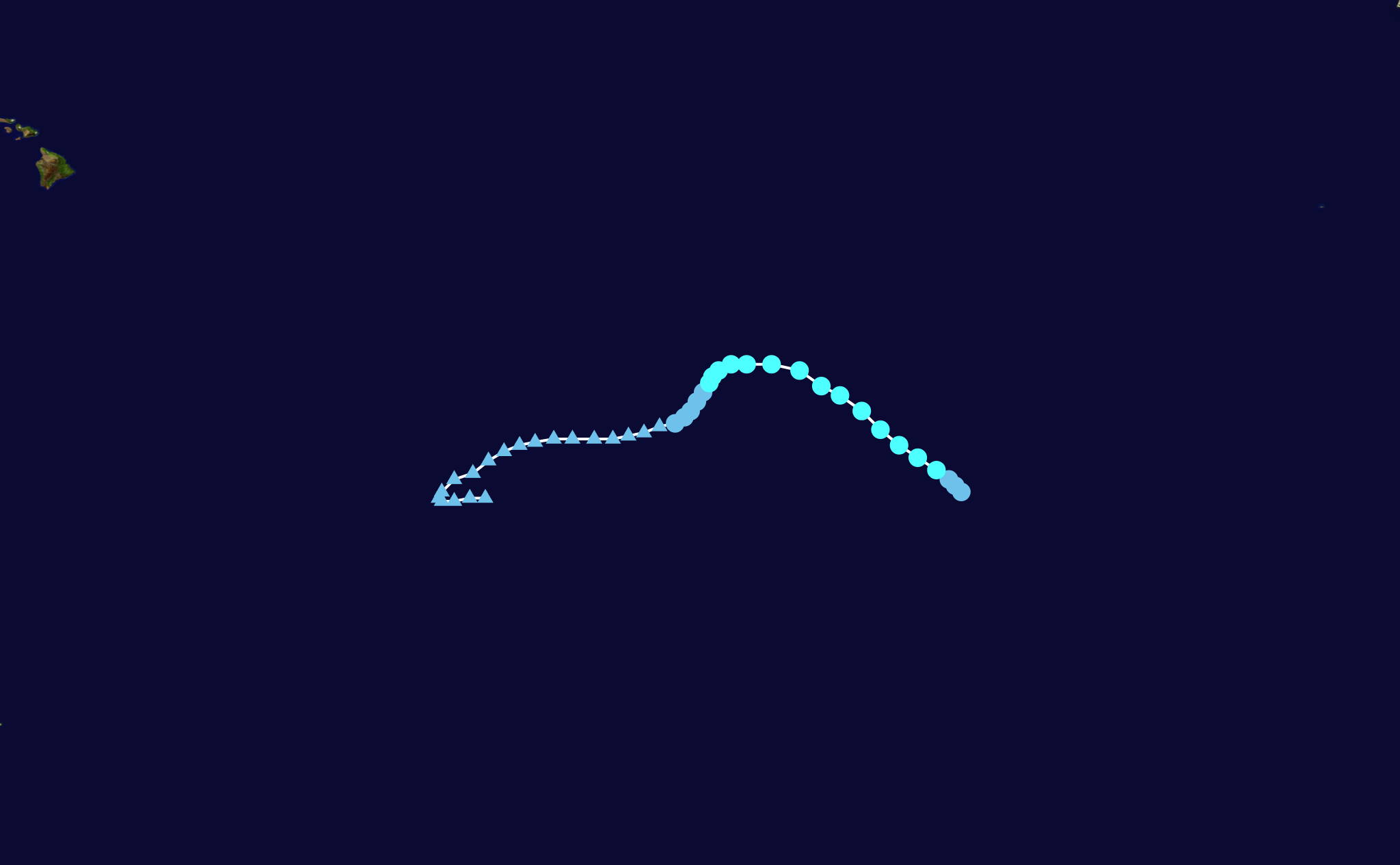
- Duration: June 2 – June 7
- Peak intensity: 50 mph (85 km/h) (1-min); 1003 mbar (hPa)

On May 31, the National Hurricane Center (NHC) noted that an area of low pressure could form well to the southwest of the Baja California Peninsula. The system quickly organized over time and was designated as Tropical Depression One-E on June 2. The next day, the depression strengthened into a tropical storm and was named Amanda. From June 3 to June 4, Amanda strengthened and organized slightly, though suffering from some wind shear. On June 5, Amanda began weakening and its center became completely exposed, with the storm weakening into a tropical depression the following day in the face of shear and dry air, though warm waters allowed Amanda to continue producing some convection. Amanda continued to wane through June 7 as environmental shear and dry air increased. By June 8, Amanda lacked enough convection to be considered a tropical cyclone, transitioning into a remnant low.

=== Tropical Storm Boris ===
- Tropical storm (SSHWS)
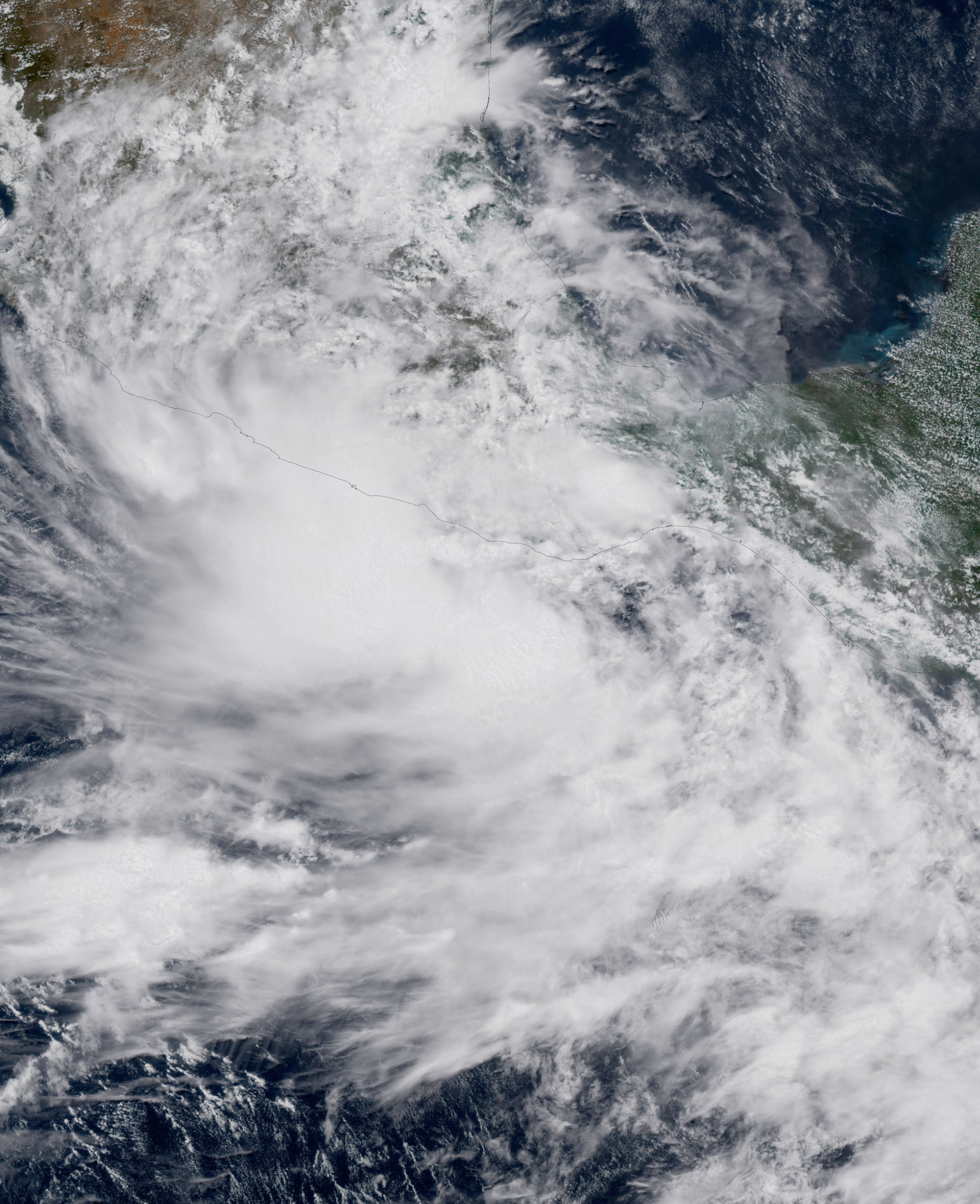
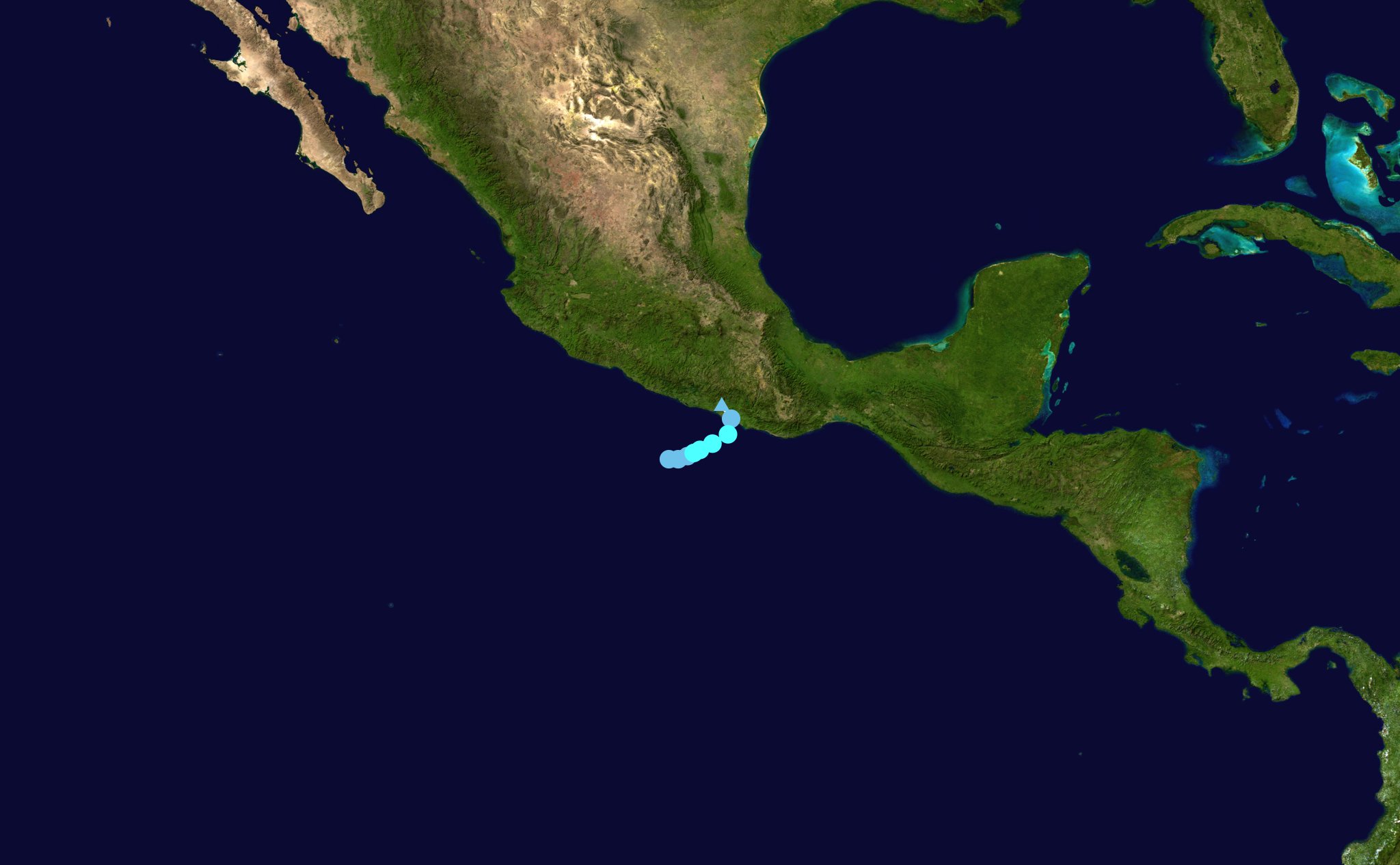
- Duration: June 7 – June 9
- Peak intensity: 50 mph (85 km/h) (1-min); 1000 mbar (hPa)

On June 3, the NHC noted the possibility of an area of low pressure forming off the southwestern coast of Mexico. On June 7, an Oceansat-3 pass had indicated that the disturbance had consolidated a closed low-level circulation, the low was classified as Tropical Depression Two-E at 15:00 UTC. Early the next day, the system acquired tropical storm-force winds and received the name Boris. On June 9, Boris made landfall on the far southwestern coast of Oaxaca, the rugged terrain causing it to quickly weaken, transitioning into a post-tropical cyclone and dissipating soon afterward.

One person died in Manzanillo, Colima, in rough seas. Two additional people were swept away by rough surf in Tecomán and later found dead. Commercial losses in Acapulco were estimated at Mex$1.5 billion (US$87.1 million). In Oaxaca, a man drowned after his truck was swept away by an overflowing river. An outdoor theater worth Mex$54 million (US$3.16 million) was destroyed by swells. As of July 2026, Arthur J. Gallagher & Co. estimated that losses totaled to US$100 million.

=== Tropical Storm Cristina ===
- Tropical storm (SSHWS)
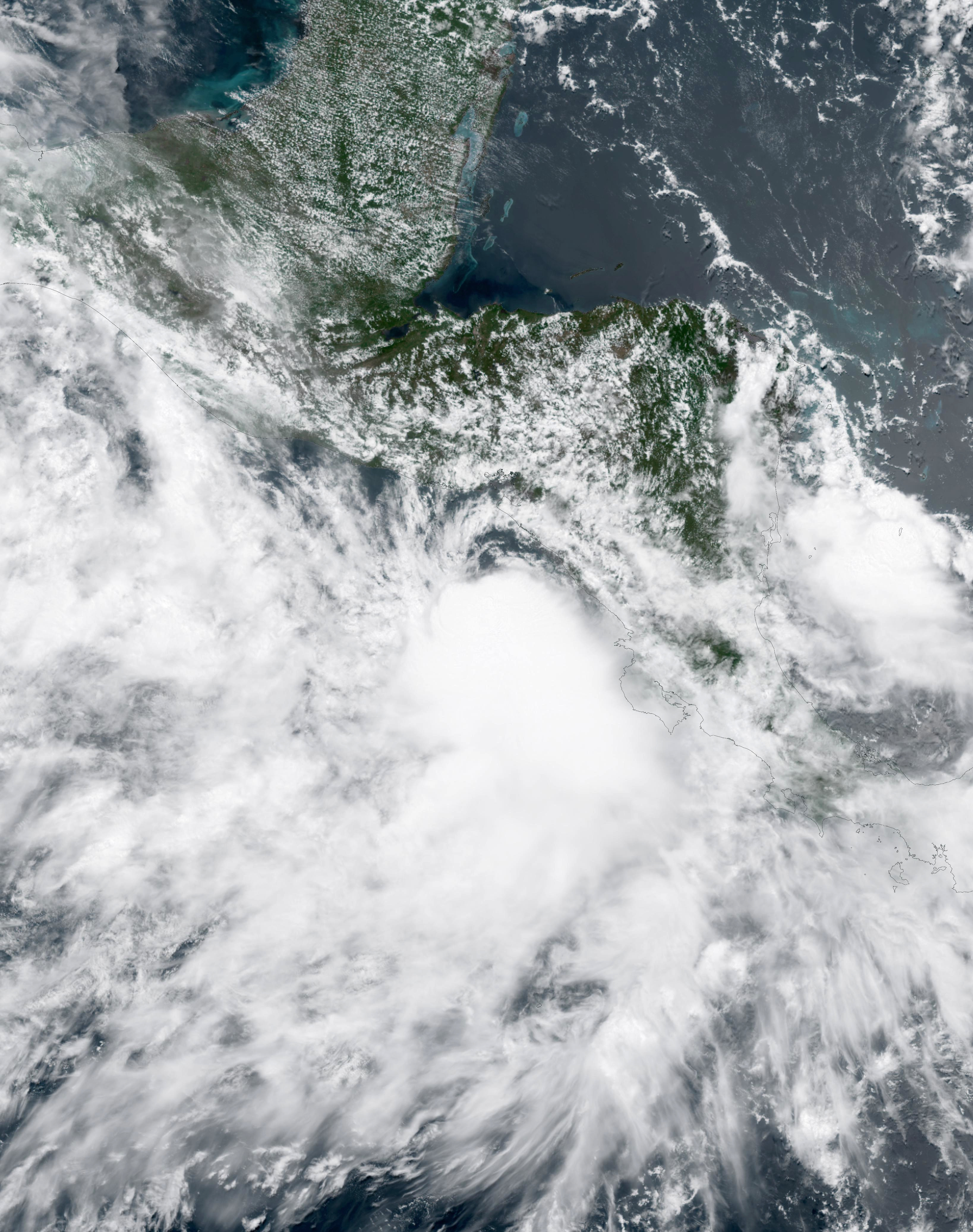
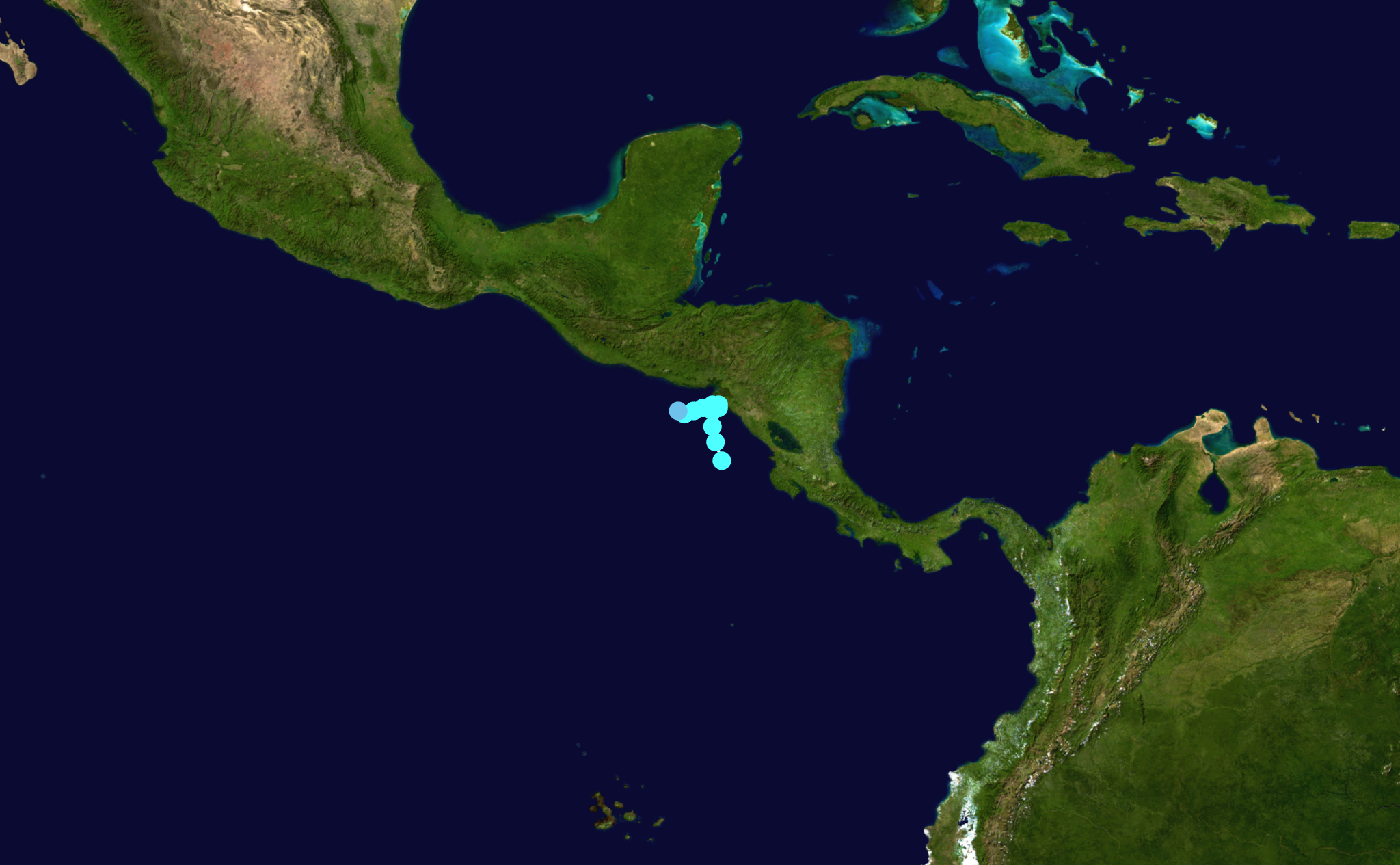
- Duration: June 8 – June 10
- Peak intensity: 50 mph (85 km/h) (1-min); 1002 mbar (hPa)

On June 3, the NHC noted the possibility of an area of low pressure forming off the western coast of Central America. On June 8, the low organized into a tropical depression and was designated Tropical Depression Three-E. Soon thereafter, the depression strengthened into a tropical storm, being named Cristina while simultaneously reaching its peak intensity. Cristina then started to weaken due to interaction with nearby land. Cristina then continued to weaken, opening up into a trough on June 11. The trough then merged with a low pressure system which later produced heavy rainfall along the western Gulf of Mexico coast.

Prior to becoming a tropical depression, Cristina produced heavy rains that caused flooding in San Pedro Sula, Honduras, killing a 60-year-old man and disrupting traffic. In Santa Cruz, Costa Rica, five people were left missing after heavy winds attributed to Cristina capsized two boats. Across El Salvador, 58 damaged or flooded homes, 11 affected vehicles, 38 fallen trees, 34 blocked roads and 5 landslides were reported. In Acajutla, residents and business owners estimated that losses totaled to US$150,000. Heavy rainfall related to Cristina, combined with the effects of the local rainy season, resulted in five deaths and three injuries in Guatemala; two deaths occurred each in Momostenango and Casillas and a child died in Senahú. In Chiapas, heavy rainfall from Cristina caused flooding. A man was found dead after being swept away by an overflowing river.

=== Tropical Storm Douglas ===
- Tropical storm (SSHWS)
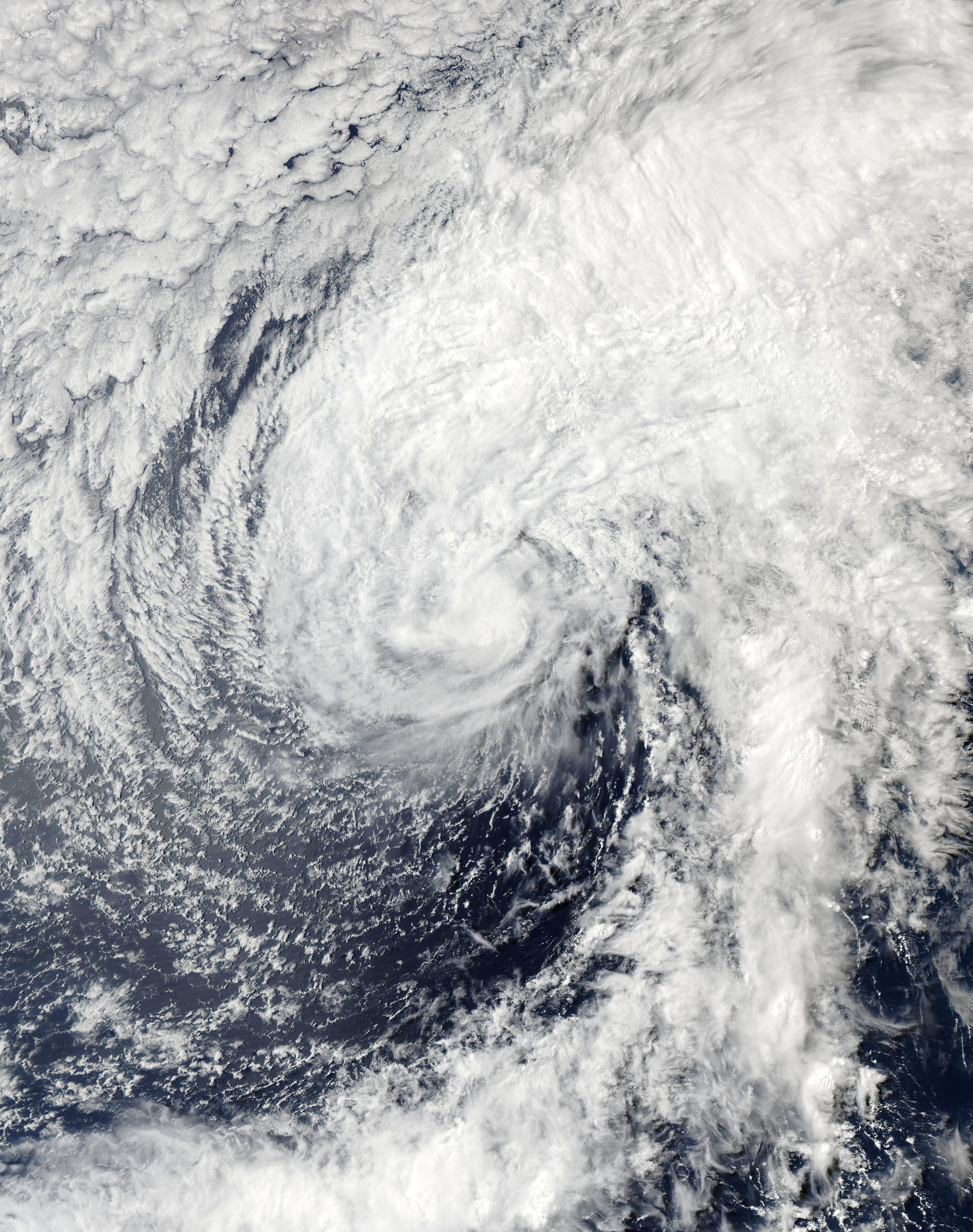
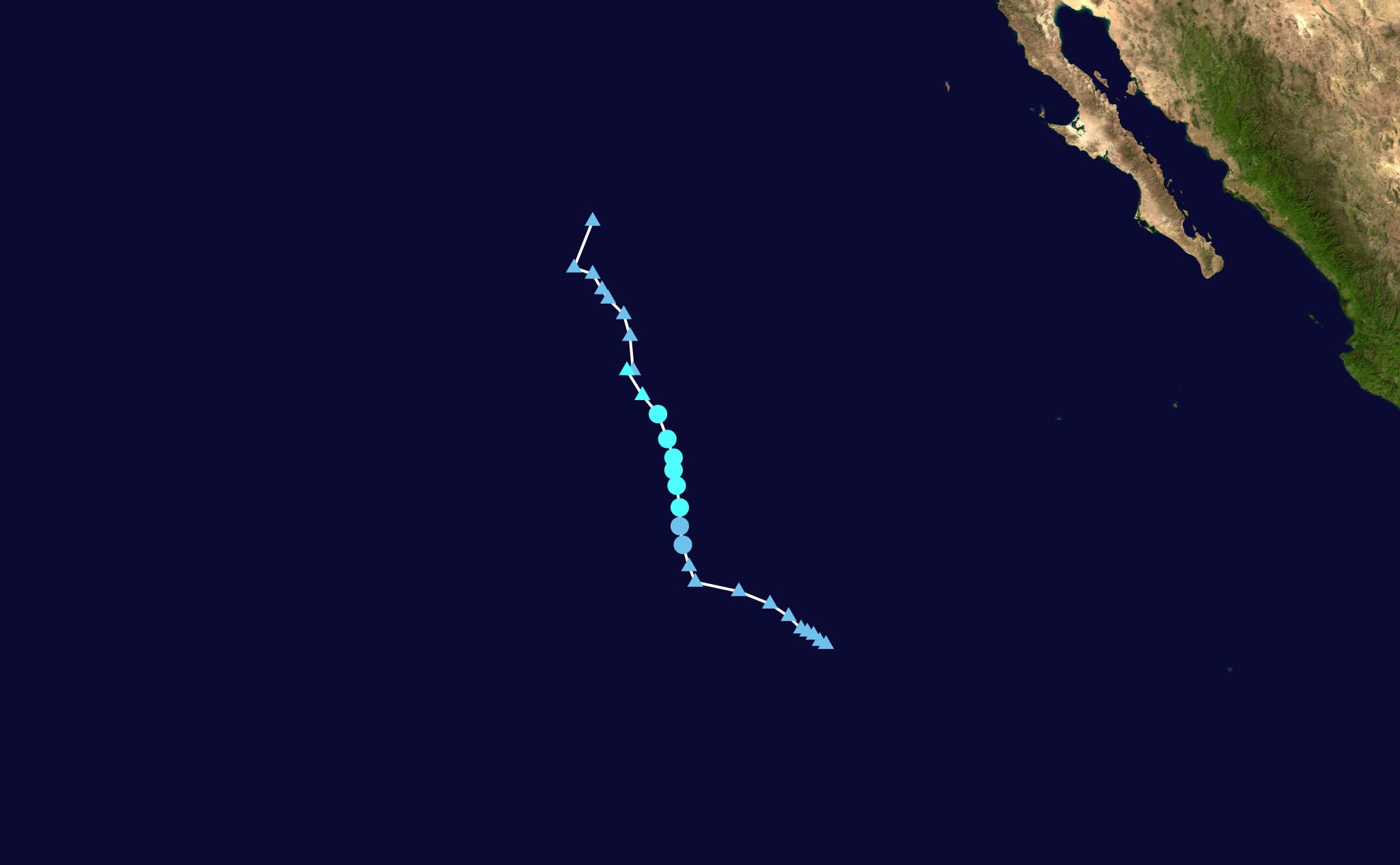
- Duration: July 1 – July 3
- Peak intensity: 40 mph (65 km/h) (1-min); 1003 mbar (hPa)

On June 21, the NHC began monitoring a disturbance off the southwestern coast of Mexico, noting the possibility of tropical development. On July 1, the low pressure system organized and was classified as Tropical Depression Four-E. Later that day, the depression strengthened into a tropical storm and received the name Douglas. The system maintained its intensity until July 3, when it weakened into a post-tropical low.

=== Tropical Storm Elida ===
- Tropical storm (SSHWS)
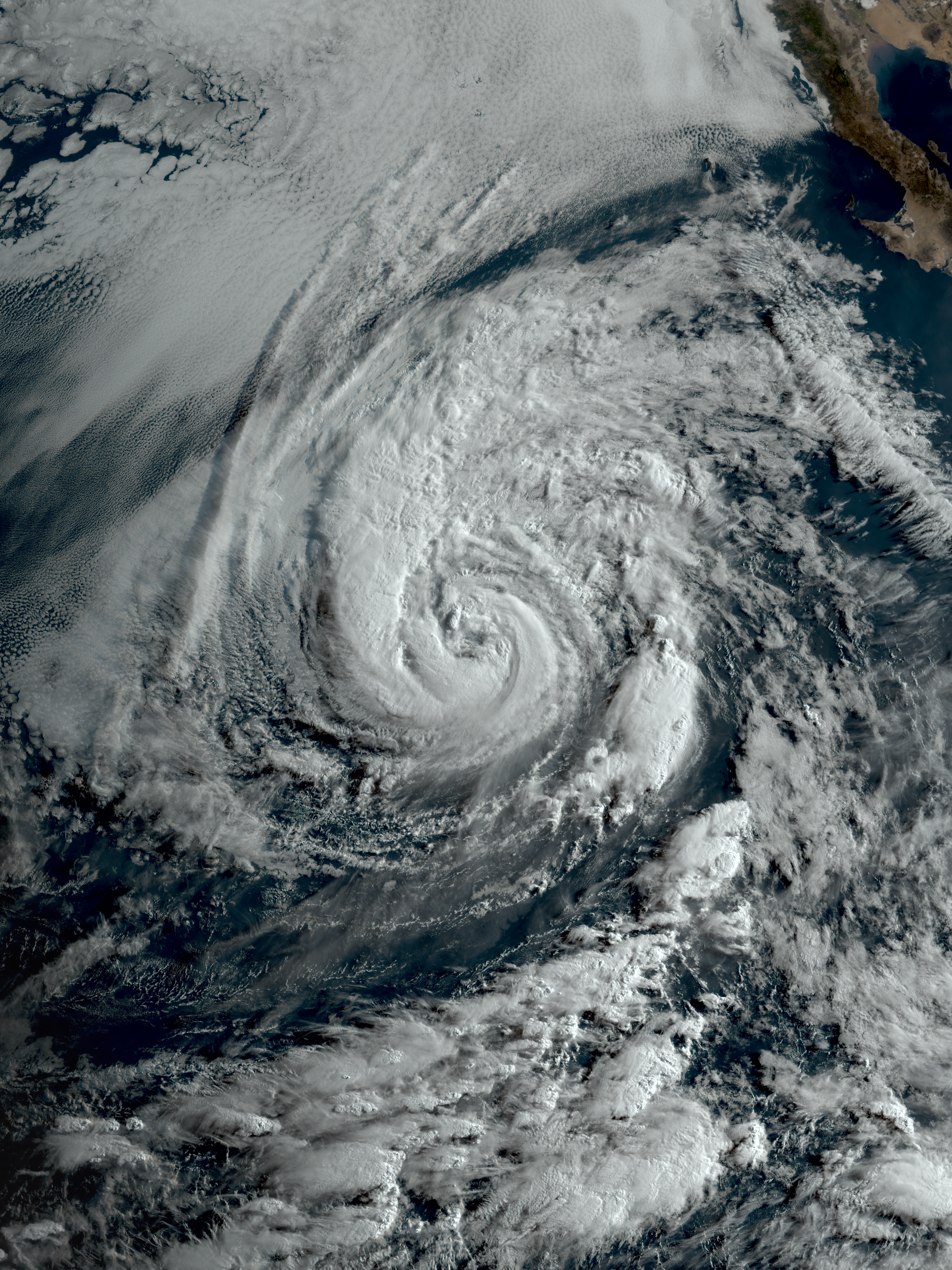
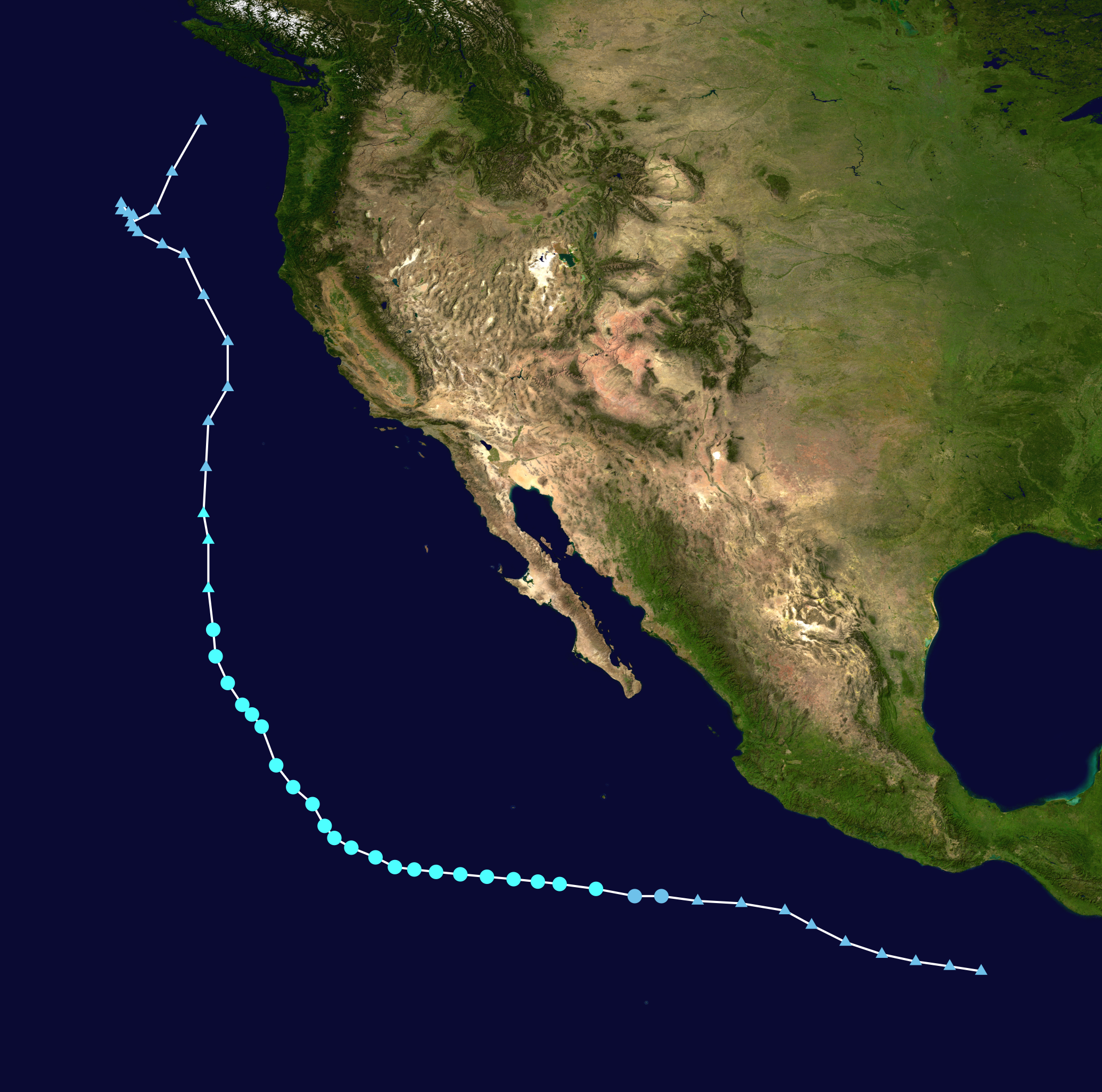
- Duration: July 14 – July 20
- Peak intensity: 70 mph (110 km/h) (1-min); 990 mbar (hPa)

On July 7, at 06:00 UTC, the NHC began monitoring a disturbance off the coast of southern Mexico. On July 14 at 18:00 UTC, the system organized into a tropical depression and was designated Five-E. The next day, the depression strengthened into a tropical storm and was given the name Elida. Strengthening, Elida attained its peak intensity on July 18. The storm then started to weaken, and became post-tropical on July 20.

Elida impacted Clarion Island with strong winds and rough seas throughout July 16. The remnants of Elida, as well as the more distant Hurricanes Fausto and Genevieve, produced significant swells that impacted the California coast on July 25. A total of 464 water rescues took place in San Diego while another 160 rescues took place in Oceanside. The Los Angeles County Fire Department performed a record 1,950 rescues on July 25. Further north, more than 25 rescues occurred at beaches in the Santa Cruz area that same day. A lifeguard who was caught on video performing one of these rescues in Santa Cruz was invited to the White House to receive a high civilian honor.

=== Hurricane Fausto ===
- Category 2 hurricane (SSHWS)
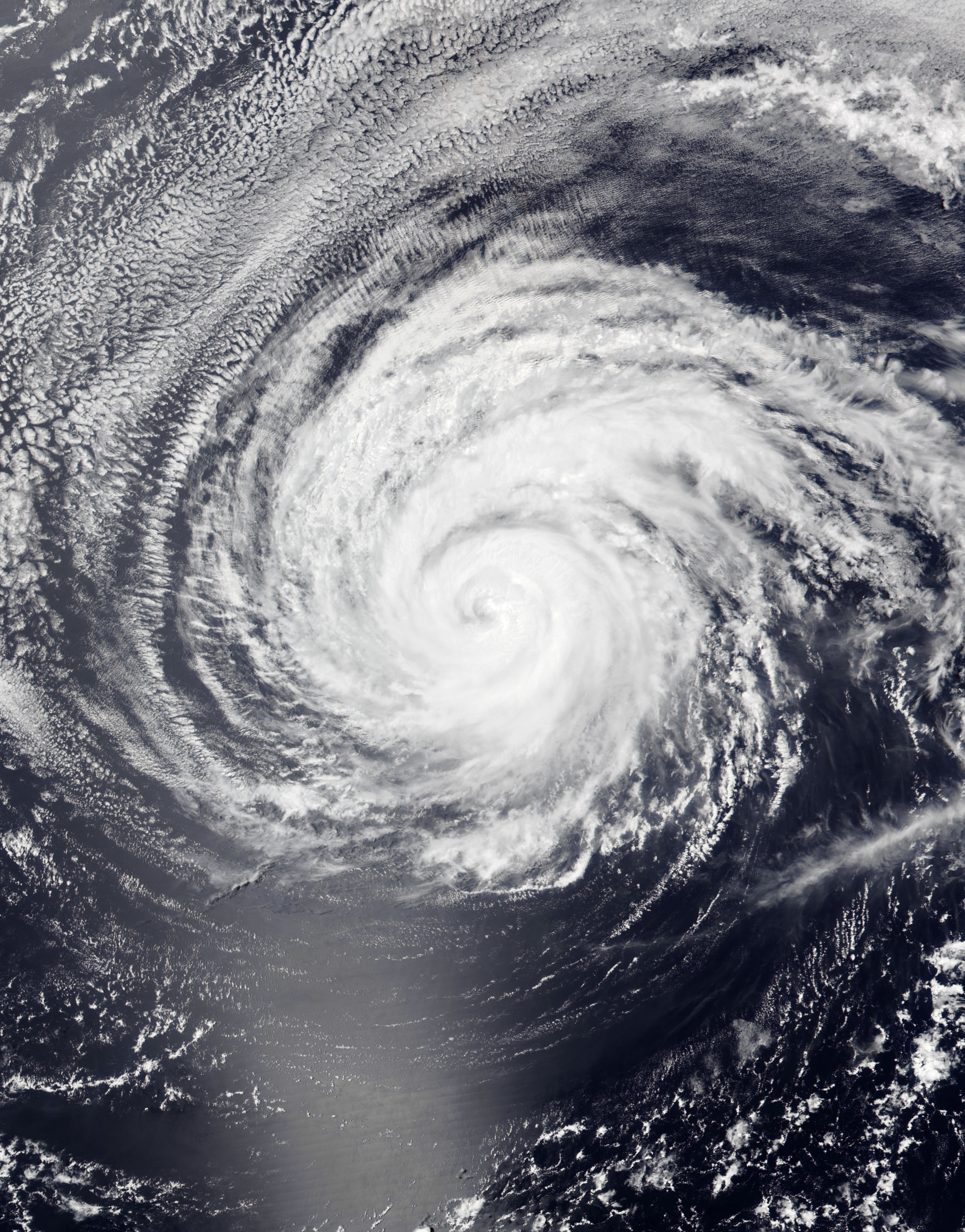
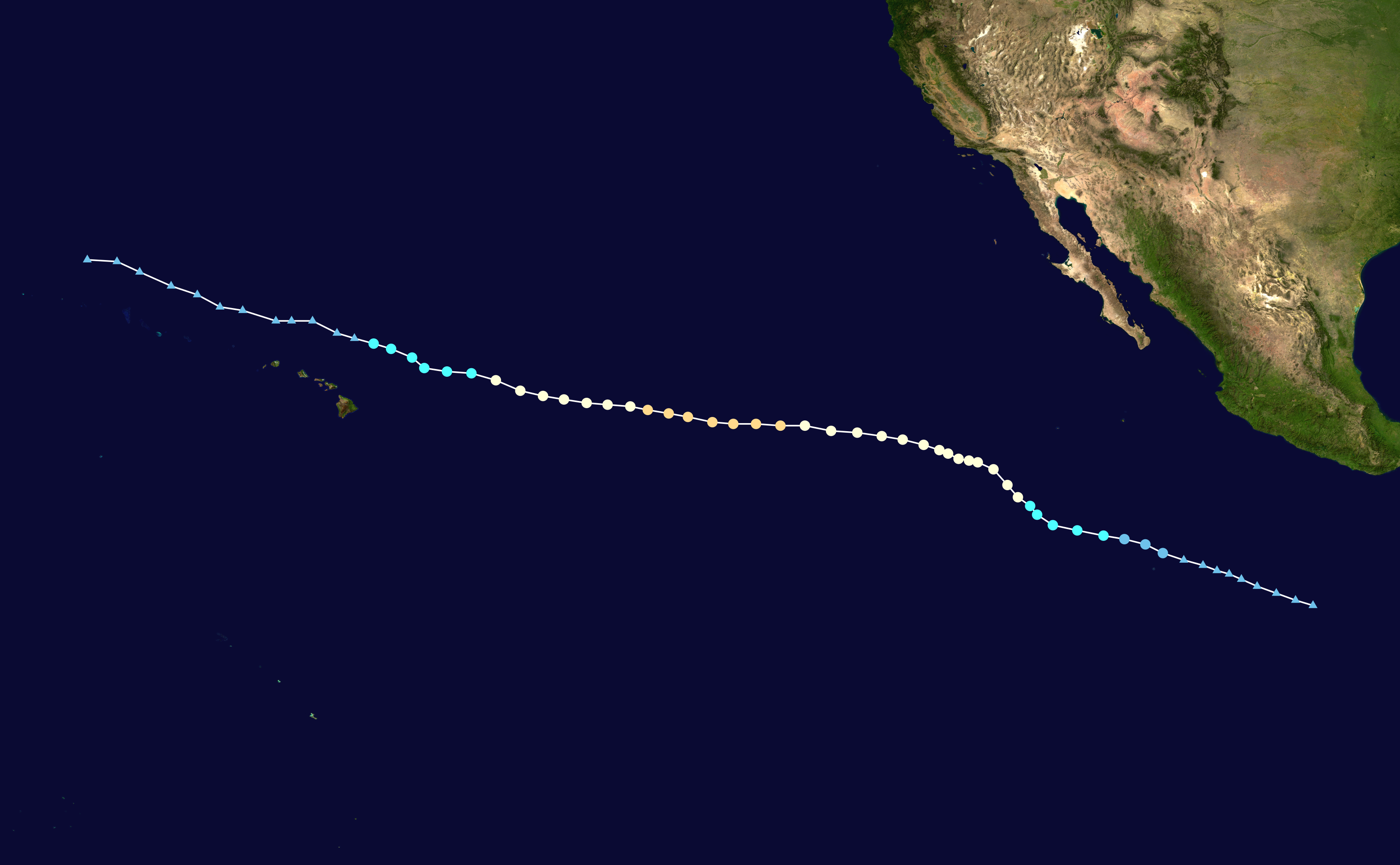
- Duration: July 19 – July 29
- Peak intensity: 105 mph (165 km/h) (1-min); 967 mbar (hPa)

On July 12, the NHC began monitoring an area for development. The low organized and was designated Tropical Depression Six-E at 03:00 UTC on July 19. The depression continued to organize and strengthened to Tropical Storm Fausto at 21:00 UTC later that day. Fausto strengthened slowly over the next few days, and strengthened into a hurricane at 03:00 UTC on July 22. The storm then became a Category 2 hurricane on July 24. Fausto then started to weaken, and lost hurricane status on July 28. Fausto, continuing to weaken, ultimately degenerated into a remnant low the following day.

Fausto impacted the Revillagigedo Islands with strong winds and rough seas throughout July 20. Significant swells from Fausto also affected the California coast in conjunction with the remnants of Elida and the developing Genevieve.

=== Hurricane Genevieve ===
- Category 5 hurricane (SSHWS)
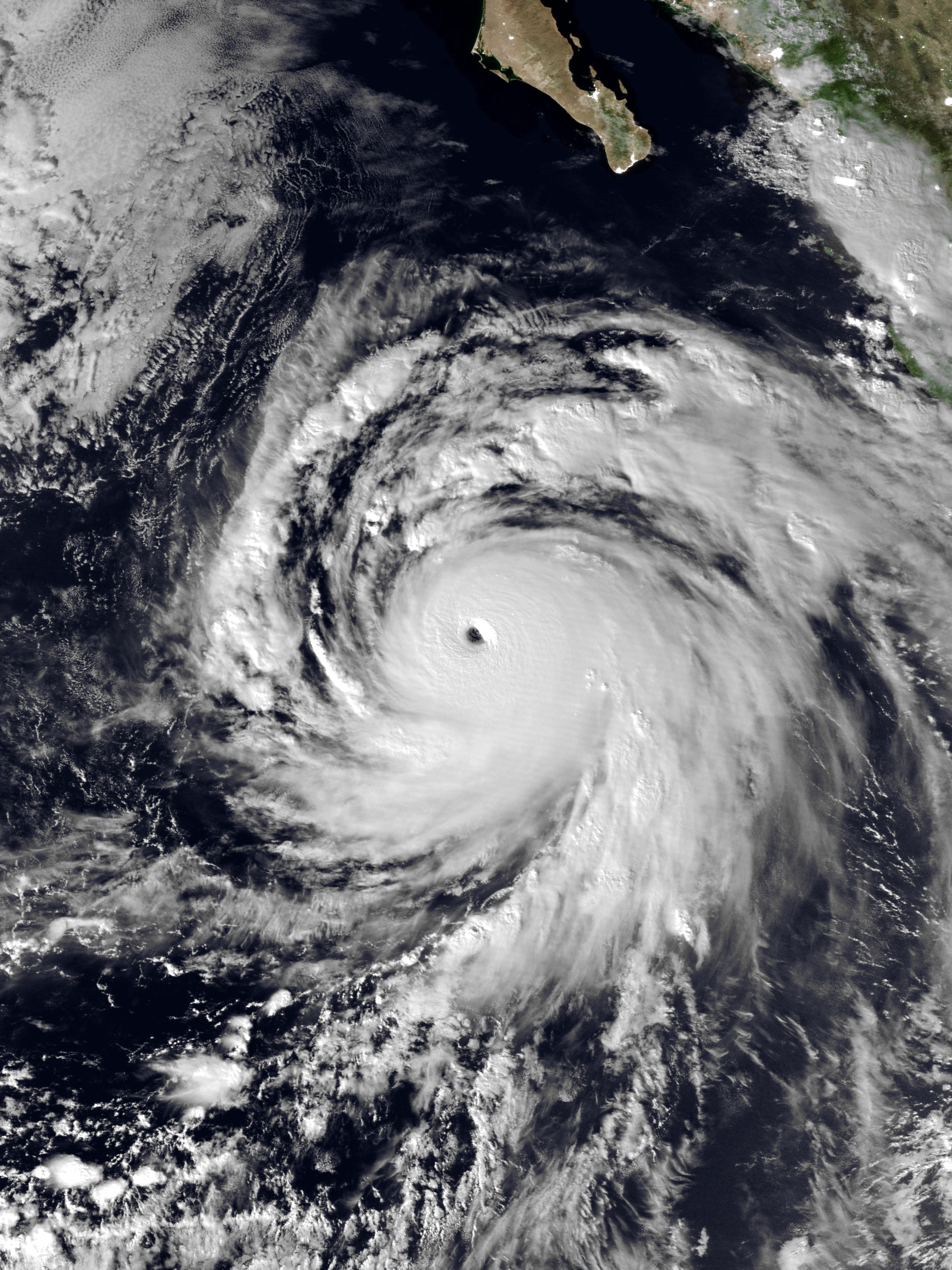
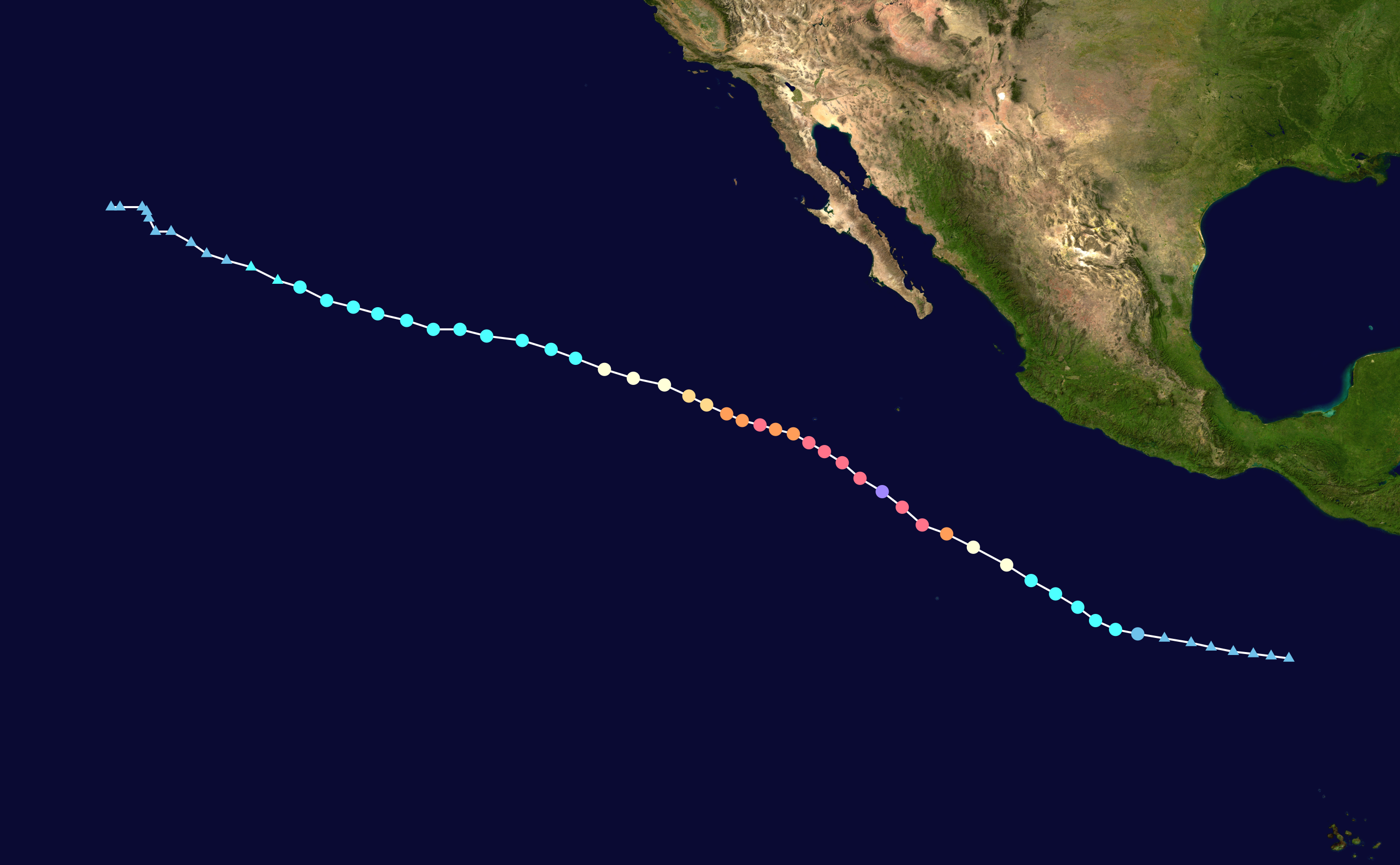
- Duration: July 24 – August 2
- Peak intensity: 160 mph (260 km/h) (1-min); 924 mbar (hPa)

A tropical wave that moved off the west coast of Africa on July 13 crossed Central America and exited into the Eastern Pacific by July 21. A low-pressure area formed on July 22 to the south of Mexico. It developed into a tropical depression at 06:00 UTC on July 24, and intensified into Tropical Storm Genevieve six hours later. Just over a day later, Genevieve attained hurricane status, amid low wind shear and warm waters. It moved west-northwestward due to a powerful ridge to its northeast. Genevieve rapidly intensified, becoming a major hurricane at 12:00 UTC on July 26, It was quickly upgraded to a Category 4 hurricane as it cleared out a warm and symmetric eye. Based on several satellite estimates, the NHC upgraded Genevieve to a Category 5 hurricane at 06:00 UTC on July 27, with peak winds of 160 mph (260 km/h) and a minimum central pressure of 924 mbar (27.32 inHg). Soon after its peak, Genevieve began an eyewall replacement cycle, as the eye became cloud-filled and replaced by an outer eyewall. On July 28, Genevieve fell to a Category 3 hurricane after being affected by dry air and wind shear. The hurricane unexpectedly re-intensified to a Category 4 hurricane on July 29. After this brief resurgence, Genevieve resumed weakening due to the dry air and wind shear, and its eye collapsed. The deepest convection became displaced to the south and east of its center. At 00:00 UTC on July 31, Genevieve was downgraded to a tropical storm. Genevieve continued to weaken and degenerated to a post-tropical cyclone at 18:00 UTC on August 2.

Genevieve generated swells that caused rough surf and rip current conditions along the western coast of Baja California peninsula and parts of Southwestern Mexico. Genevieve produced blustery conditions on Clarion Island, with a peak sustained wind of 63 mph (101 km/h) and a peak wind gust of 86 mph (138 km/h) being observed. Genevieve also generated swells that caused coastal flooding in Southern California, leading to the cancellation of two Pacific Surfliner trains, as well as delays on Metrolink. City officials in Long Beach constructed sand berms on local beaches to prevent flooding from increased tides. A High Surf advisory was issued for Southern California beaches from between July 29 and August 1 due to the threat of dangerous surf conditions. Several water rescues occurred from rough ocean conditions.

=== Tropical Storm Hernan ===
- Tropical storm (SSHWS)
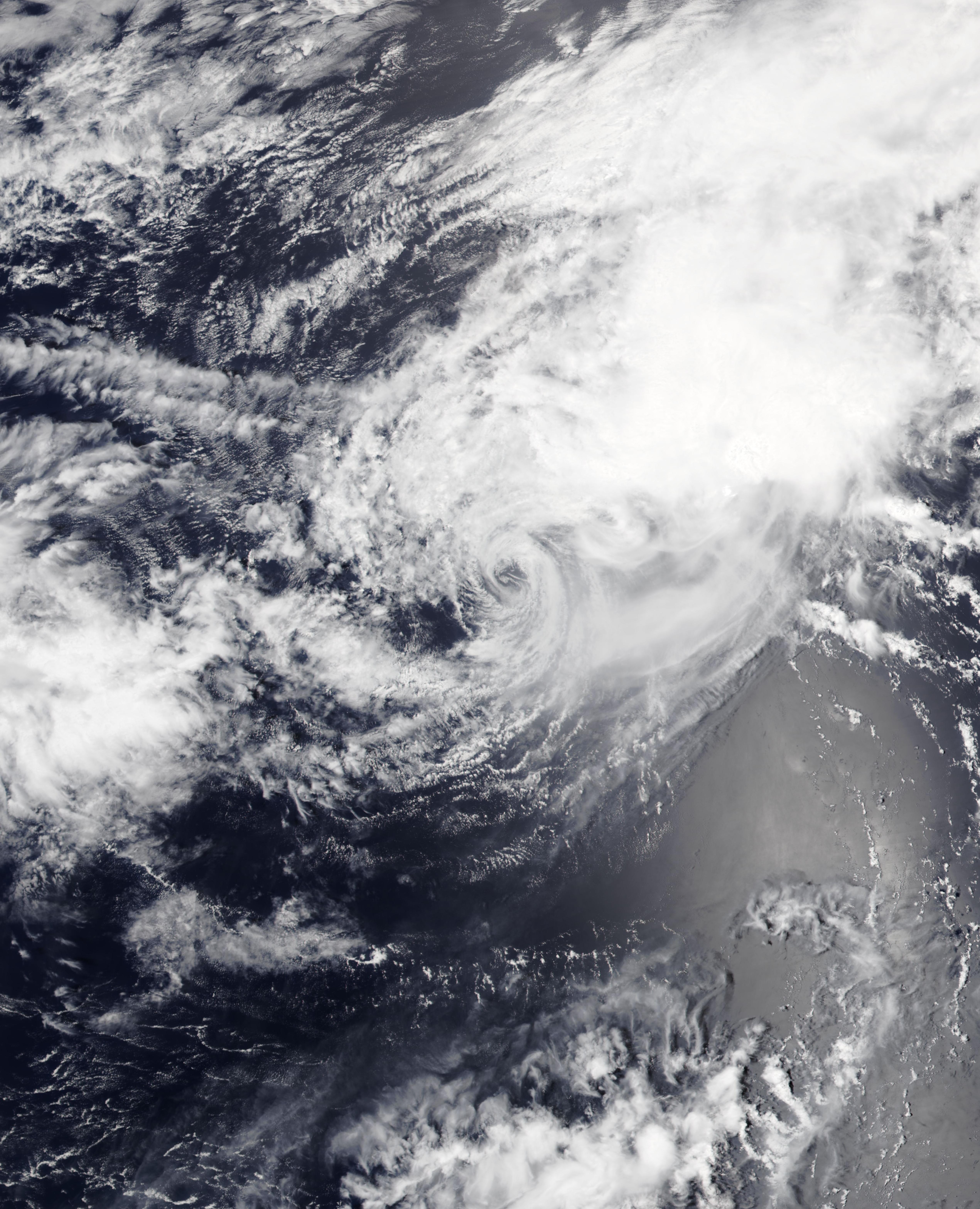
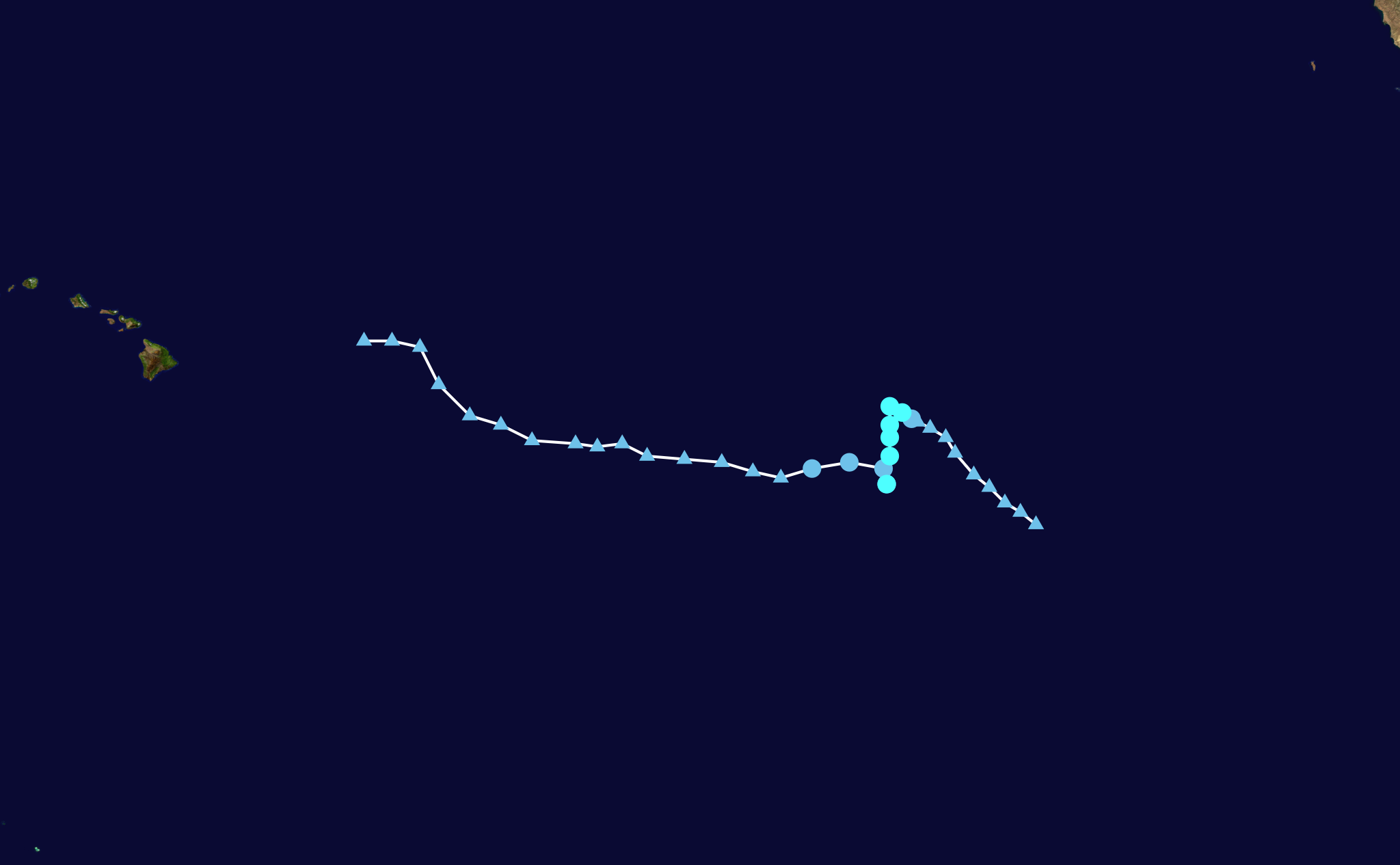
- Duration: August 12 – August 15
- Peak intensity: 45 mph (75 km/h) (1-min); 1003 mbar (hPa)

On August 8, the NHC began monitoring a tropical wave south of Baja California. The system slowly organized over the next few days, and the disturbance was designated Tropical Depression Eight-E on August 12 at 18:00 UTC. The cyclone continued to strengthen and was upgraded to a tropical storm six hours later, being named Hernan. Hernan peaked in intensity shortly thereafter before weakening to a tropical depression a day later. Hernan then further degenerated to a remnant low on August 15.

=== Hurricane Lala ===
- Category 4 hurricane (SSHWS)
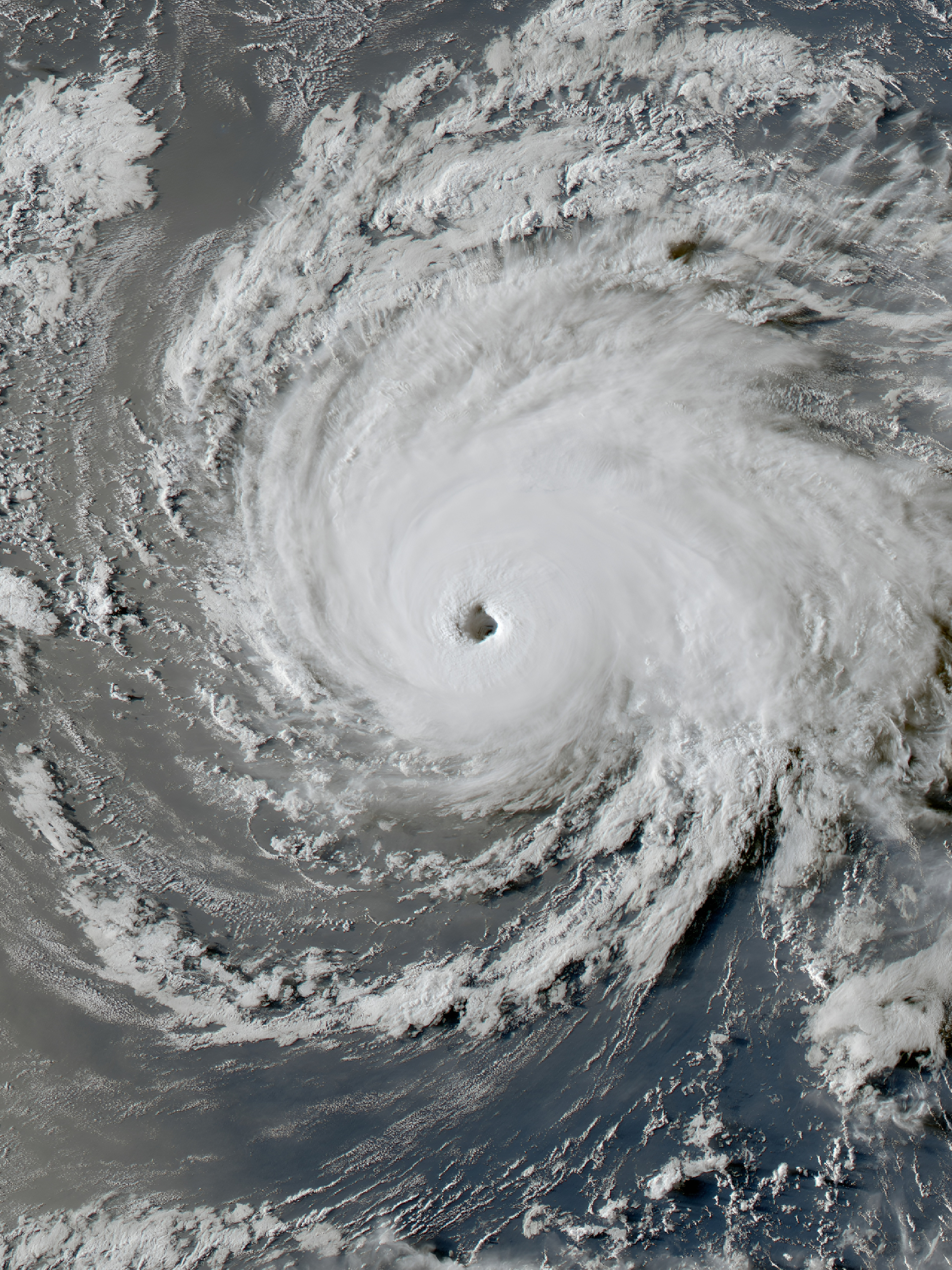
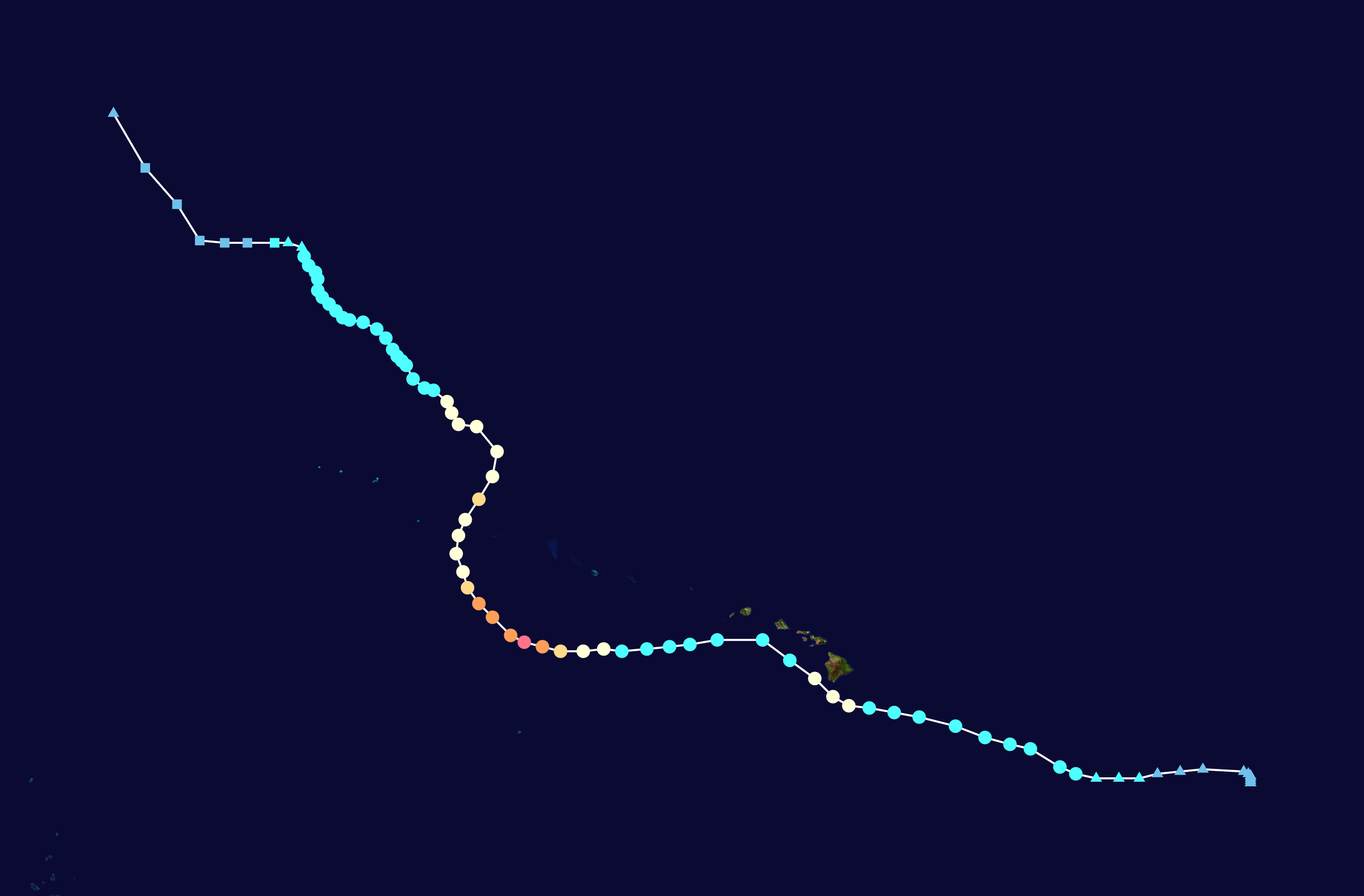
- Duration: August 13 – August 28
- Peak intensity: 130 mph (215 km/h) (1-min); 947 mbar (hPa)

On August 12, the NHC designated Potential Tropical Cyclone One due to a tropical disturbance east-southeast of Hawaii. A day later, the NHC redesignated the system as Tropical Storm Lala, after increased convection and consolidation of the circulation. The storm strengthened while moving towards Hawaii, but was deterred slightly by dry air intrusions. At 19:00 UTC on August 15, Lala attained hurricane status. At 03:00 UTC on August 16, Lala passed just south of the Big Island with winds of 80 mph (130 km/h). Land interaction quickly weakened Lala back to a tropical storm, but it regained hurricane status on August 18 after passing the island chain. Lala rapidly intensified, attaining peak winds of 130 mph (215 km/h) on August 19, with a minimum pressure of 947 mbar (28.0 inHg). A trough to its north turned Lala to the north, bringing it through the Papahānaumokuākea Marine National Monument on August 21. By that time, it had weakened due to dry air and cooler waters. Lala fell to tropical storm status on August 23. It turned back to the northwest due to a building ridge. Stronger wind shear caused the storm to weaken on August 27. On August 28, Lala transitioned into a post-tropical cyclone. The system crossed the International Date Line later that day, with the Joint Typhoon Warning Center (JTWC) marking it as a subtropical system, while the Japan Meteorological Agency (JMA) classified it as an extratropical low.

A 93-year-old woman was found deceased in her home in Nāʻālehu following the storm. In addition, one man was killed and two others were injured, including one critically, as a result of a head-on car accident in Hawaiian Ocean View due to inclement weather caused by Lala's passage. A few days after Lala's passage, an unidentified man, believed to be in his 60s, was found deceased near Hawaiʻi Belt Road in Nāʻālehu in a pasture, with his death being attributed to Lala. Elsewhere, another woman was hospitalized with moderate injuries after she was swept 100 yards away by floodwaters after her home was knocked off its foundation in Waiʻōhinu. As of October 2026, Arthur J. Gallagher & Co. estimated losses to be at US$1 billion.

=== Tropical Storm Moke ===
- Tropical storm (SSHWS)
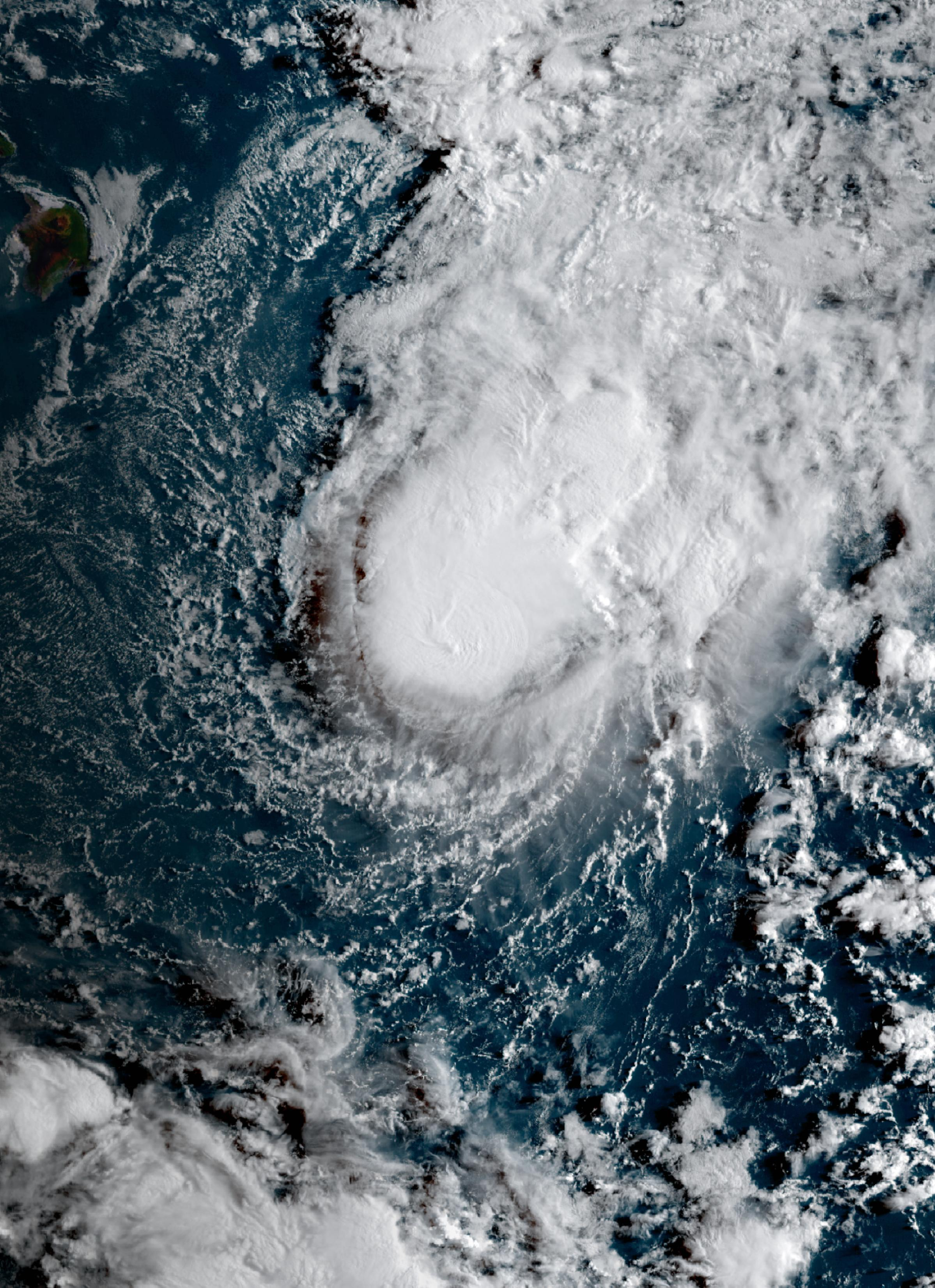
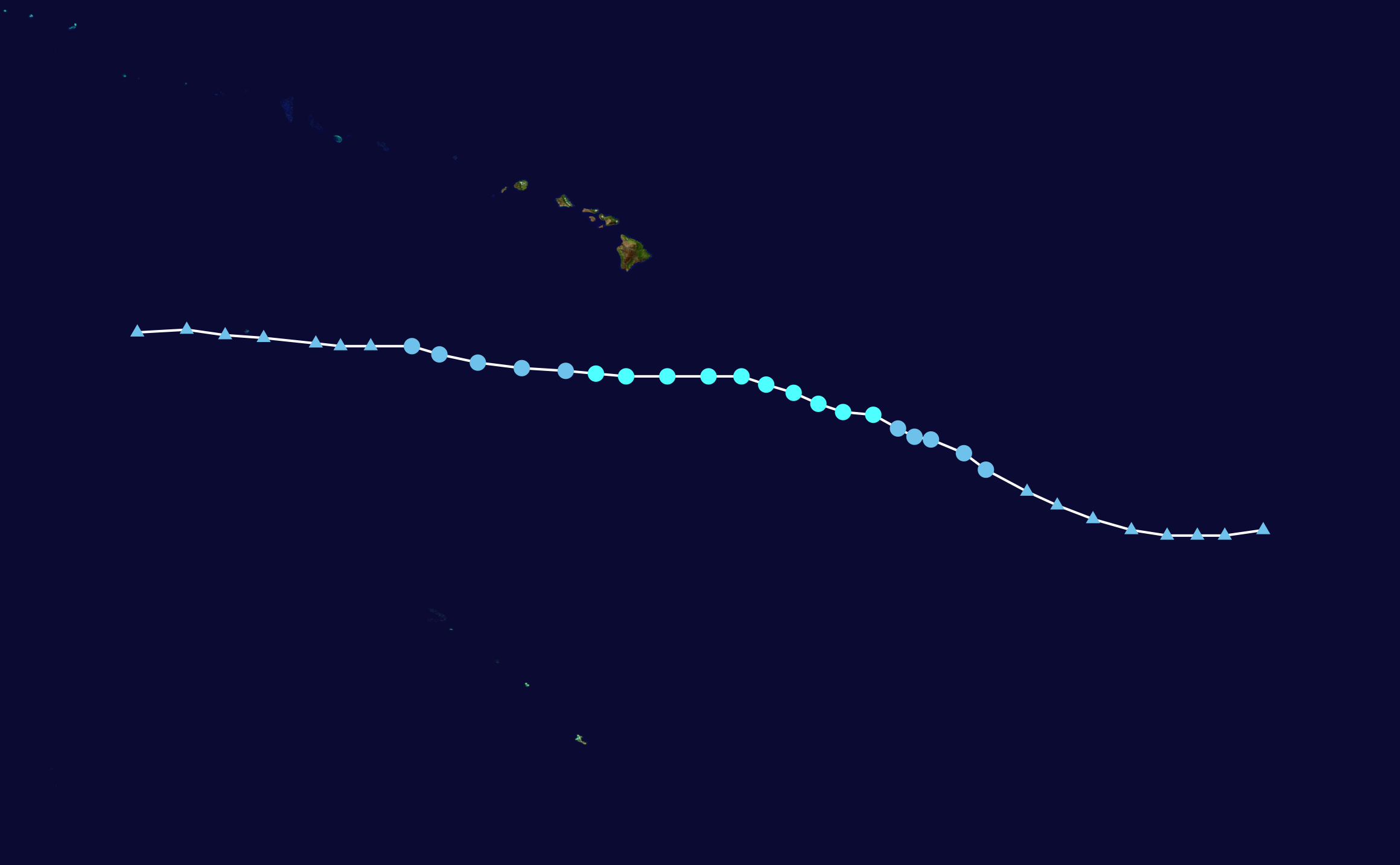
- Duration: August 20 – August 25
- Peak intensity: 50 mph (85 km/h) (1-min); 994 mbar (hPa)

A tropical depression formed about 960 miles (1,540 km) east-southeast of Hilo over the Central Pacific on August 20, with the initial intensity being set at 35 mph (55 km/h) based on an earlier ASCAT pass. The next day, based on data obtained by recon, the storm was upgraded to a tropical storm, and received the name Moke. On August 22, Moke reached peak winds of 50 mph (85 km/h), as recorded by recon. On August 23, Moke passed south of the island of Hawaii as a tropical depression. Moke encountered unfavorable conditions and on August 25 at 09:00 UTC, it degenerated into a remnant low.

The NHC noted that although the storm was expected to cause some wind, rain and surf impacts in the Hawaiian Islands, no tropical storm watches or warnings were expected due to the storm's compact nature. Moke threatened Hawaii just a few days after the passage of Lala. Members of the Hawaii Army National Guard and Hawaii Air National Guard were deployed to the southern region of the Big Island to begin storm preparations for Moke in conjunction with ongoing recovery efforts from Lala. Rainfall from the storm reached 4.21 in (107 mm) near Lahaina.

=== Tropical Storm Iselle ===
- Tropical storm (SSHWS)
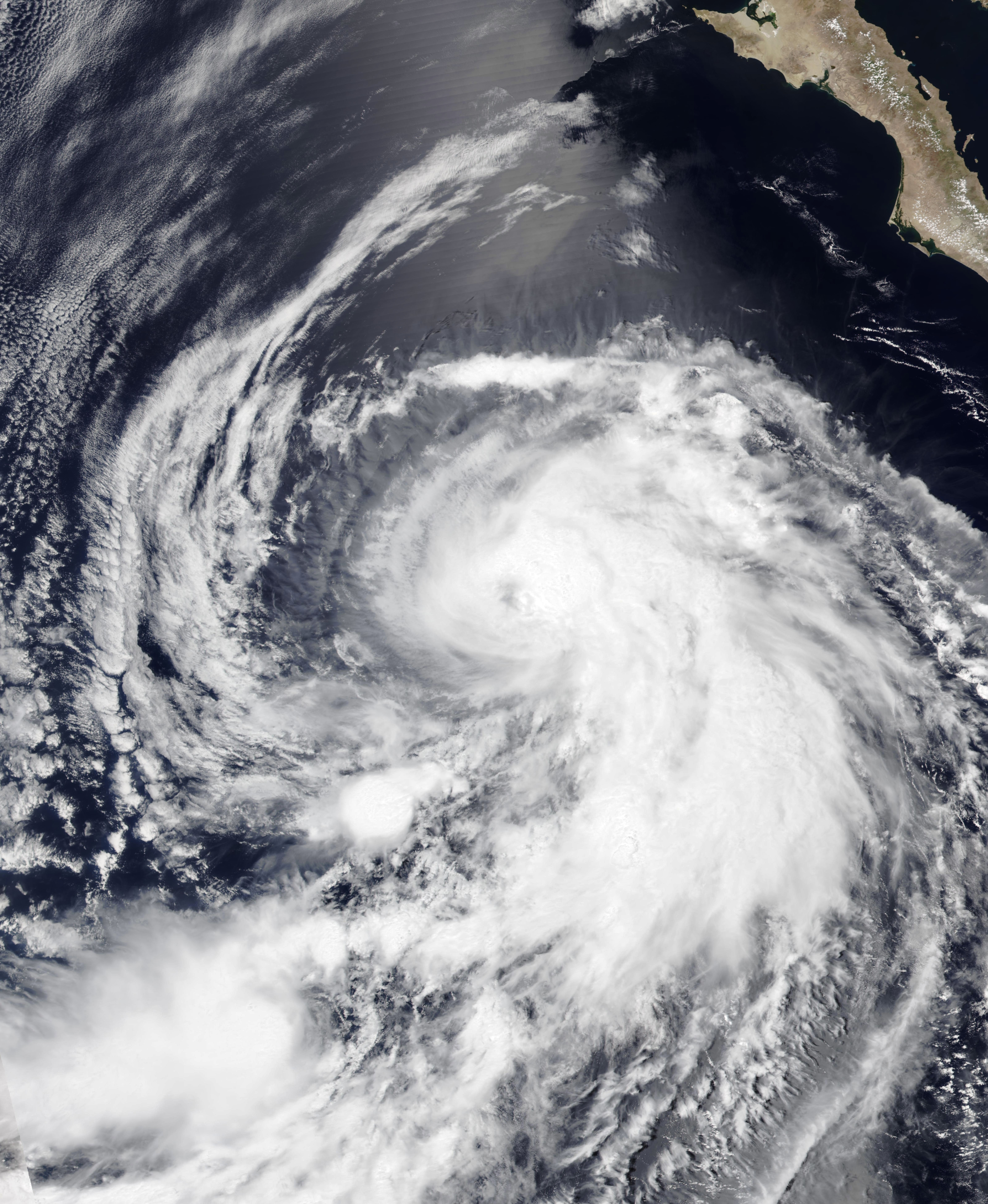
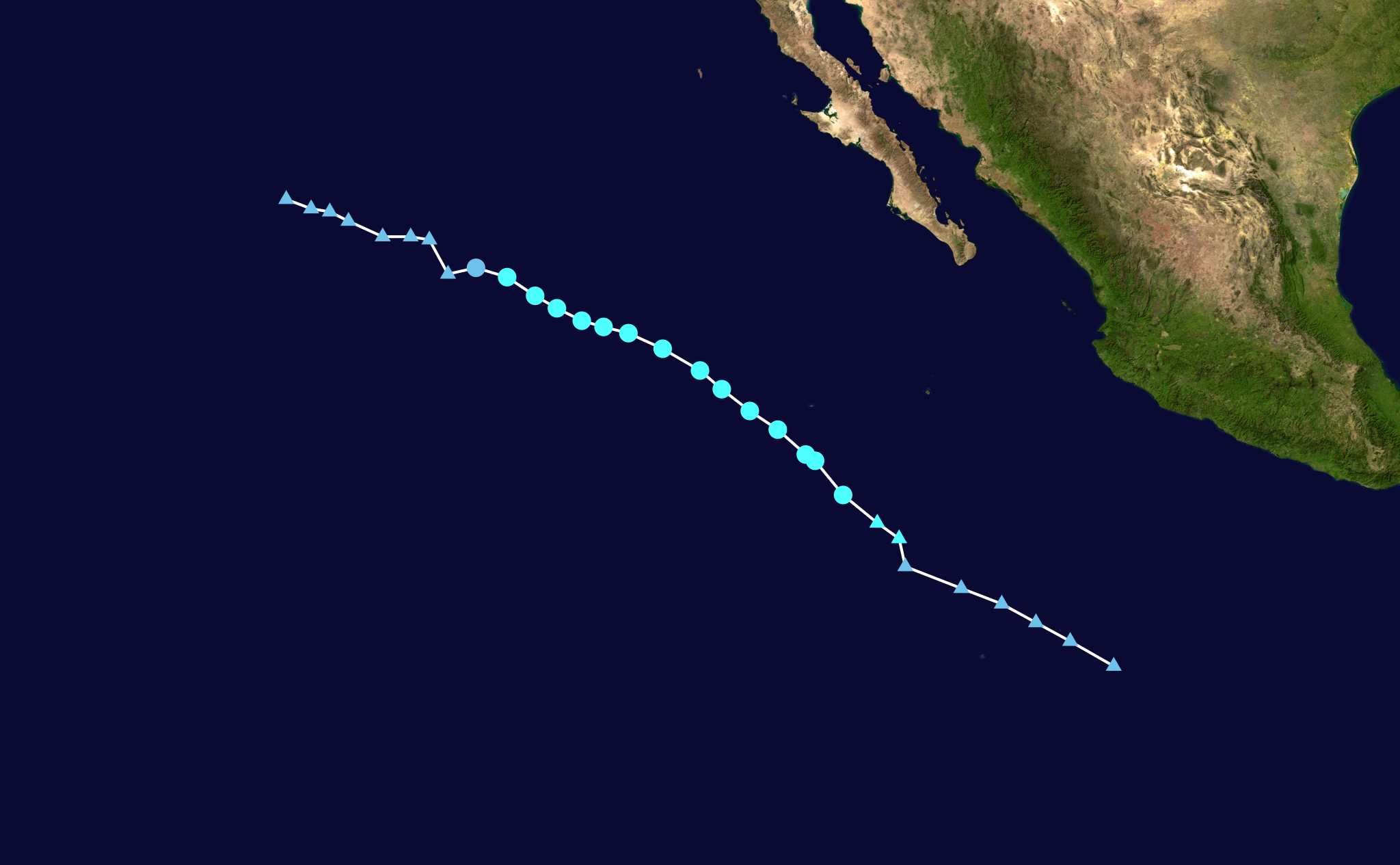
- Duration: August 23 – August 26
- Peak intensity: 70 mph (110 km/h) (1-min); 987 mbar (hPa)

An area of disturbed weather formed south of Mexico on August 21. The system became more organized overnight on August 22 and strengthened into Tropical Storm Iselle the following morning. Despite moderate wind shear, Iselle strengthened further in favorable conditions of warm waters and a moist environment, topping out at 70 mph (115 km/h) and a pressure of 988 mbar (29.2 inHg). However, Iselle began to weaken later on August 25, as a result of cooler sea surface temperatures, persistent wind shear, and dry air. On August 26 at 03:00 UTC, continued unfavorable conditions caused Iselle to degenerate into a post-tropical cyclone.

Iselle generated swells that affected the Revillagigedo Islands and the western coast of Baja California peninsula.

=== Tropical Storm Julio ===
- Tropical storm (SSHWS)
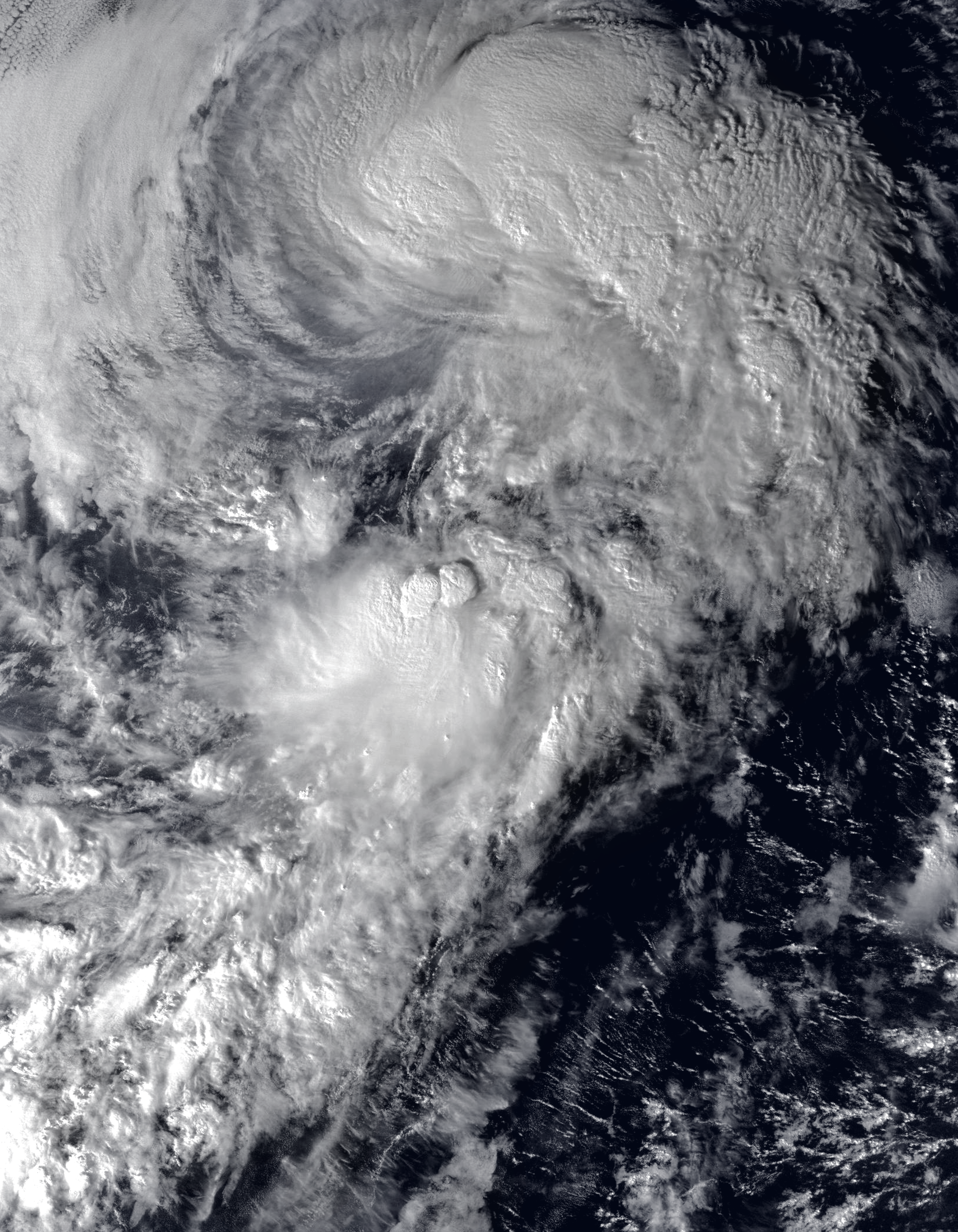
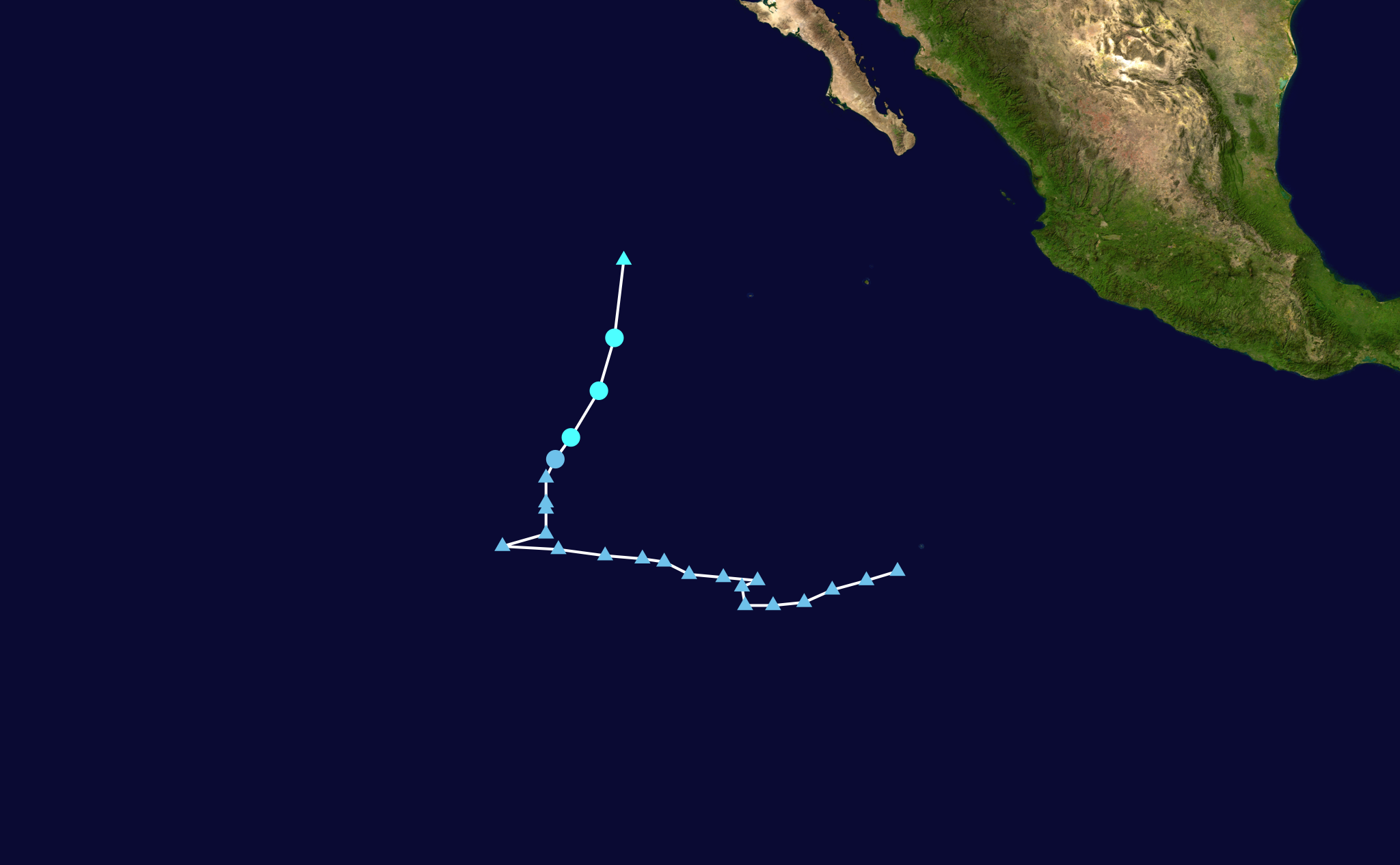
- Duration: August 24 – August 25
- Peak intensity: 50 mph (85 km/h) (1-min); 1000 mbar (hPa)

On August 24, an area of low pressure south of Mexico, a few hundred miles south-southwest of Iselle, developed tropical characteristics. As a result, the disturbance was designated Tropical Depression Ten-E. On the next day the depression was upgraded to a tropical storm, receiving the name Julio on August 25 at 09:00 UTC. Julio strengthened a little, and soon reached peak winds of 50 mph (85 km/h) and a minimum central pressure of 1,000 mbar (29.53 inHg). Julio had a brief Fujiwhara interaction with nearby Iselle, before being absorbed by it later that evening and dissipating.

=== Hurricane Karina ===
- Category 4 hurricane (SSHWS)
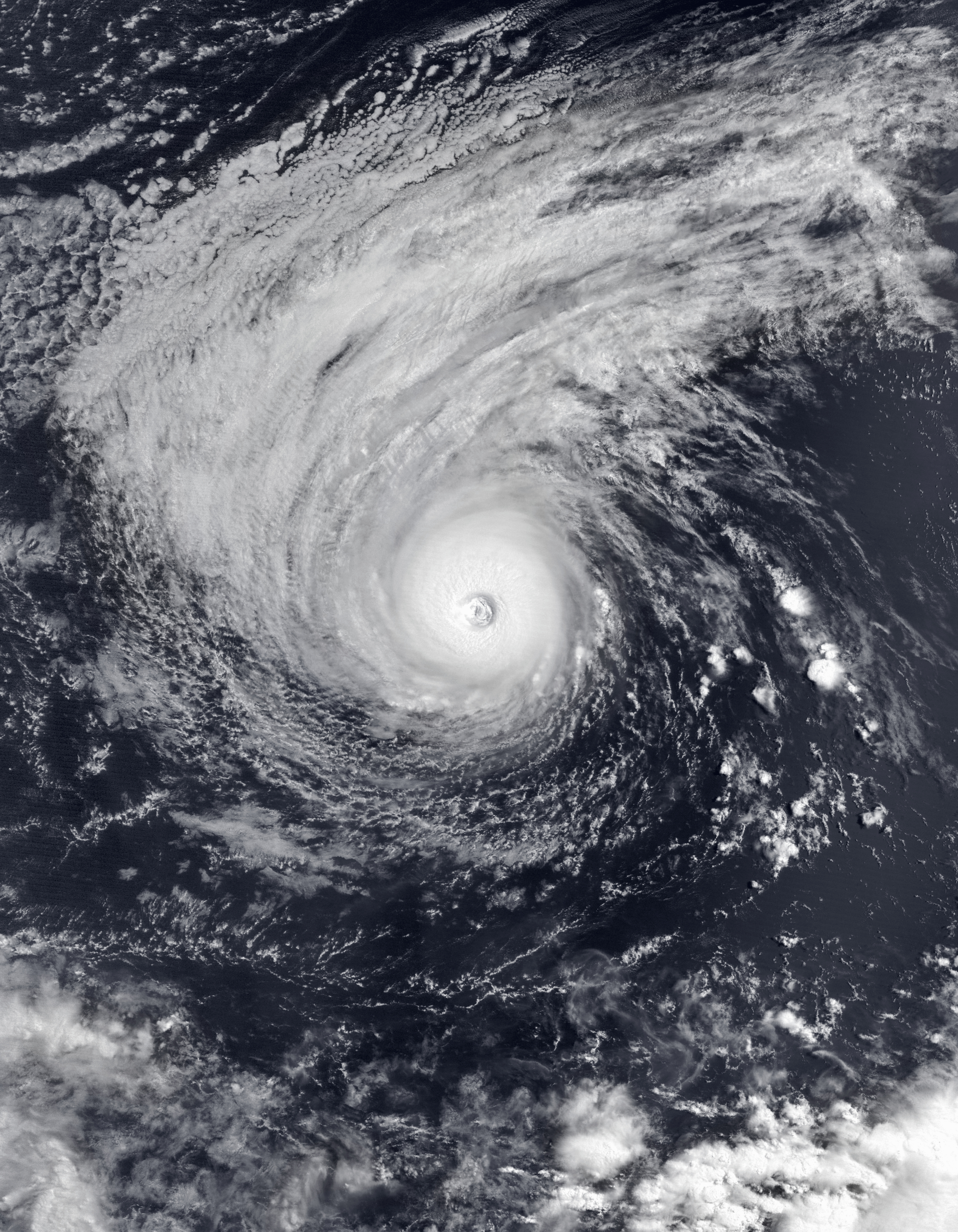
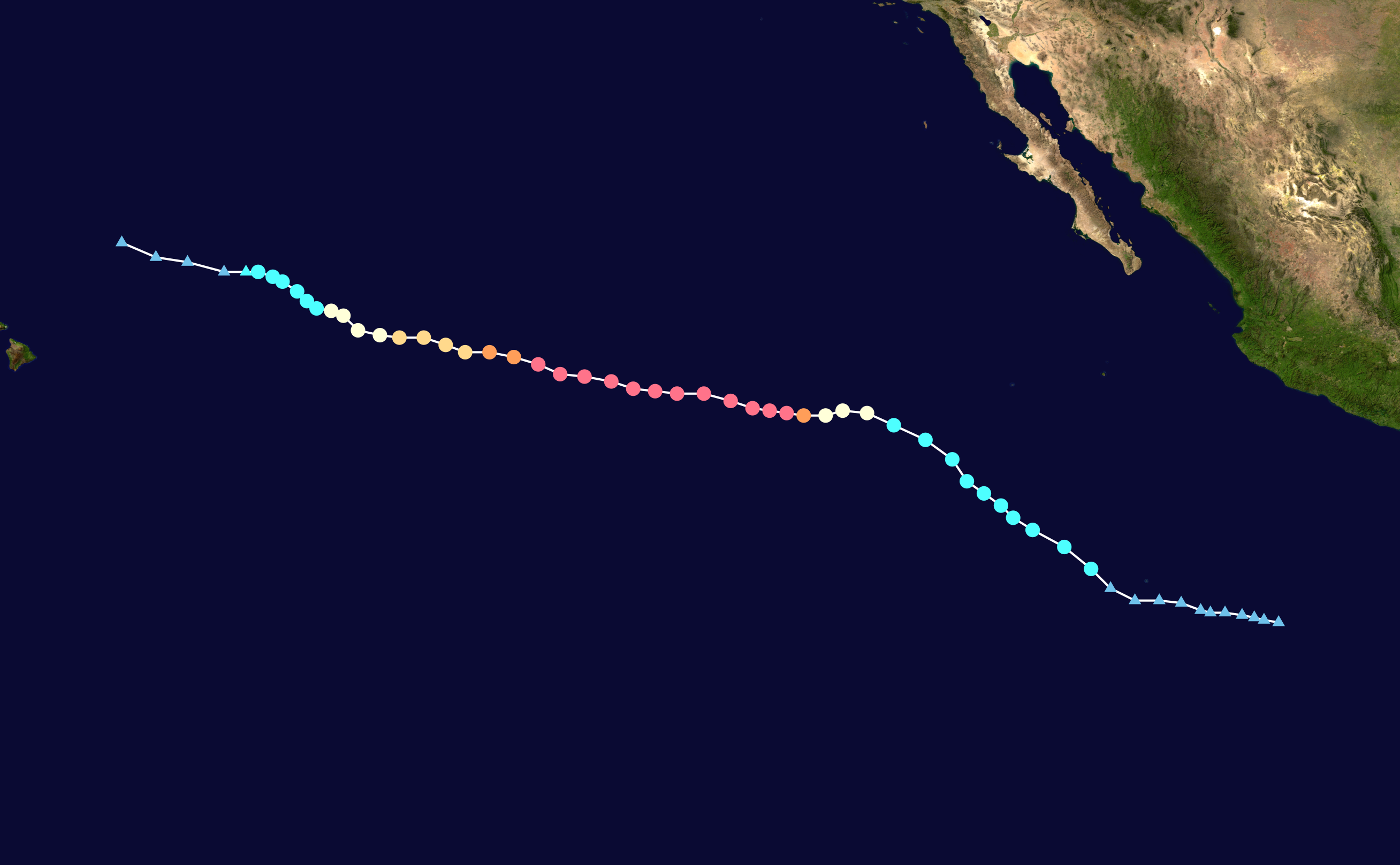
- Duration: August 27 – September 7
- Peak intensity: 145 mph (230 km/h) (1-min); 940 mbar (hPa)

Late on August 21, the NHC began noting the potential for an area of disturbed weather to form well southwest of Mexico over the next several days and undergo tropical cyclogenesis. Five days later, an area of low pressure formed in association with a tropical wave well offshore Southwestern Mexico and began to consolidate. At 21:00 UTC on August 27, the system having already attained gale-force winds was upgraded into Tropical Storm Karina. At 09:00 UTC on August 30, Karina was upgraded to a hurricane with winds of 80 mph (130 km/h) and a pressure of 980 mbar (29 inHg). Moving over warm waters near 84 °F (29 °C), Karina rapidly intensified, becoming a major hurricane at 00:00 UTC on August 31, then reaching Category 4 strength later that same day, with sustained winds of 145 mph (230 km/h) and a pressure of 942 mbar (27.82 inHg). After briefly weakening, Karina became an annular hurricane the following day, allowing the storm to maintain higher intensity over cooler waters, and slowing its weakening rate. By September 2, it began to restrengthen, eventually reaching its peak intensity with sustained winds of 145 mph (230 km/h) and a slightly lower central pressure of 940 mbar (27.76 inHg). Drier air and marginal SSTs eventually worked to weaken the cyclone, and Karina dropped below major hurricane strength on September 3 as it neared the Central Pacific basin. On September 4, at 21:00 UTC, Karina rapidly fell below hurricane status as it encountered more southwesterly shear and more dry air. The trend continued and, on September 7, Karina degenerated into a post-tropical cyclone, and was ultimately absorbed by the nearby weakening Hurricane Lowell early on September 9.

Karina impacted the uninhabited Revillagigedo Islands with rough seas and strong winds.

=== Hurricane Lowell ===
- Category 5 hurricane (SSHWS)
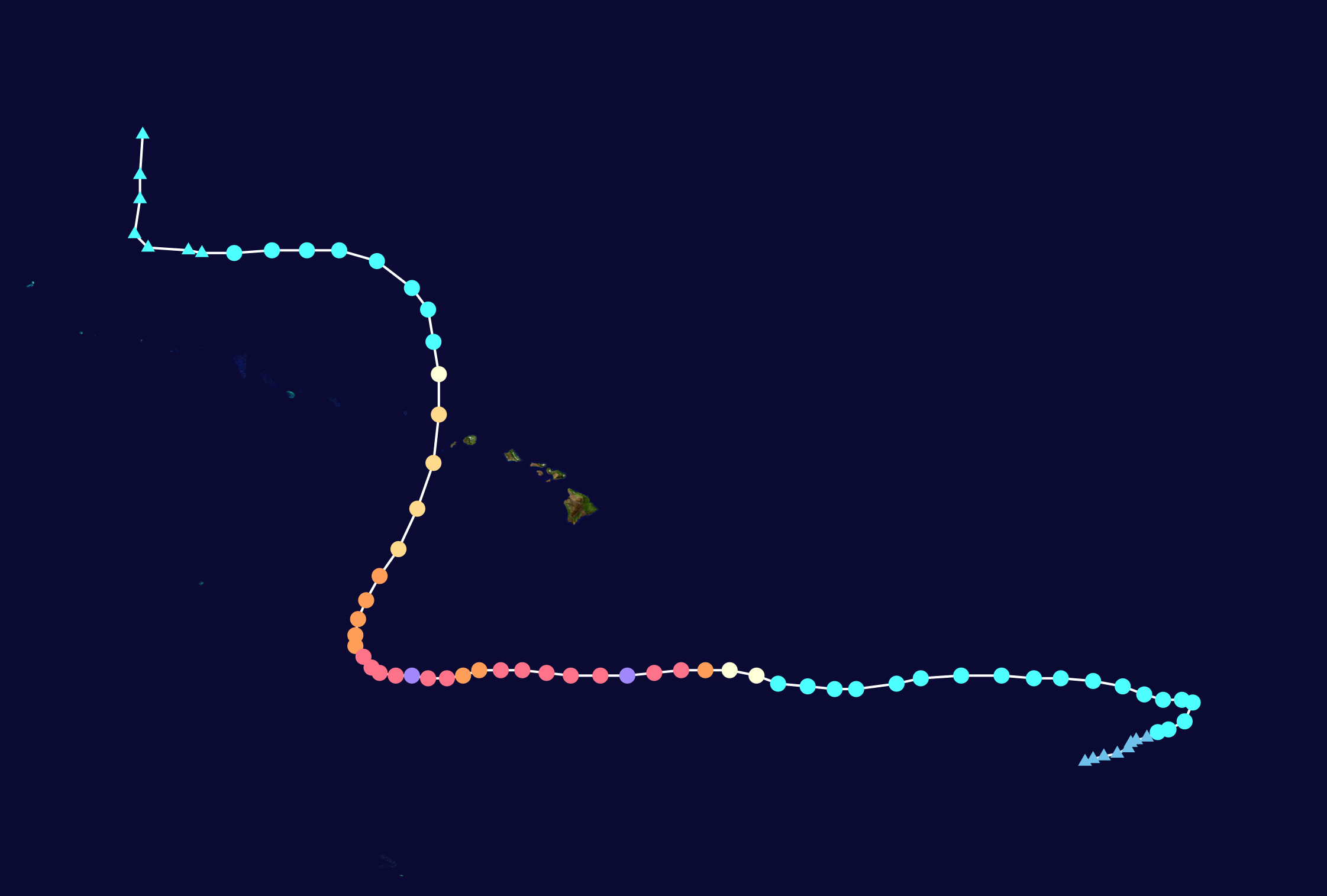
- Duration: August 27 – September 11
- Peak intensity: 160 mph (260 km/h) (1-min); 922 mbar (hPa)

At 00:00 UTC on August 27, after gaining some organization and a medium chance for development, an area of low pressure was noted by the NHC. At 21:00 UTC on August 27, scatterometer data revealed that the disturbance had developed gale-force winds and was upgraded into Tropical Storm Lowell. Lowell slowly strengthened over the next few days and organized despite easterly wind shear. On September 1 at 15:00 UTC, Lowell attained hurricane strength, and rapidly intensified into a major hurricane by 00:00 UTC on September 2. The storm continued rapidly intensifying late that day, becoming a Category 5 hurricane by 21:00 UTC. Lowell became the first Category 5 hurricane in the Central Pacific since Hurricane Walaka in 2018. Lowell weakened below Category 5 status the next day due to an increase in easterly shear. By September 4, at 09:00 UTC, Lowell further weakened to a Category 3 hurricane due to an ongoing eyewall replacement cycle. Later that day, Lowell began to undergo another phase of rapid intensification, and reintensified into a Category 5 hurricane by the following day. Soon after, Lowell weakened back to Category 4 due to increasing wind shear. The next day, Lowell weakened further into a Category 3. The next day, Lowell dropped below major hurricane status due to rising wind shear and dropping sea surface temperatures. On September 9, Lowell weakened to a tropical storm due to moderate wind shear and dry air. On September 11, Lowell degenerated into a post-tropical cyclone.

As of October 2026, Arthur J. Gallagher & Co. estimated losses to be at US$375 million.

=== Hurricane Marie ===
- Category 2 hurricane (SSHWS)
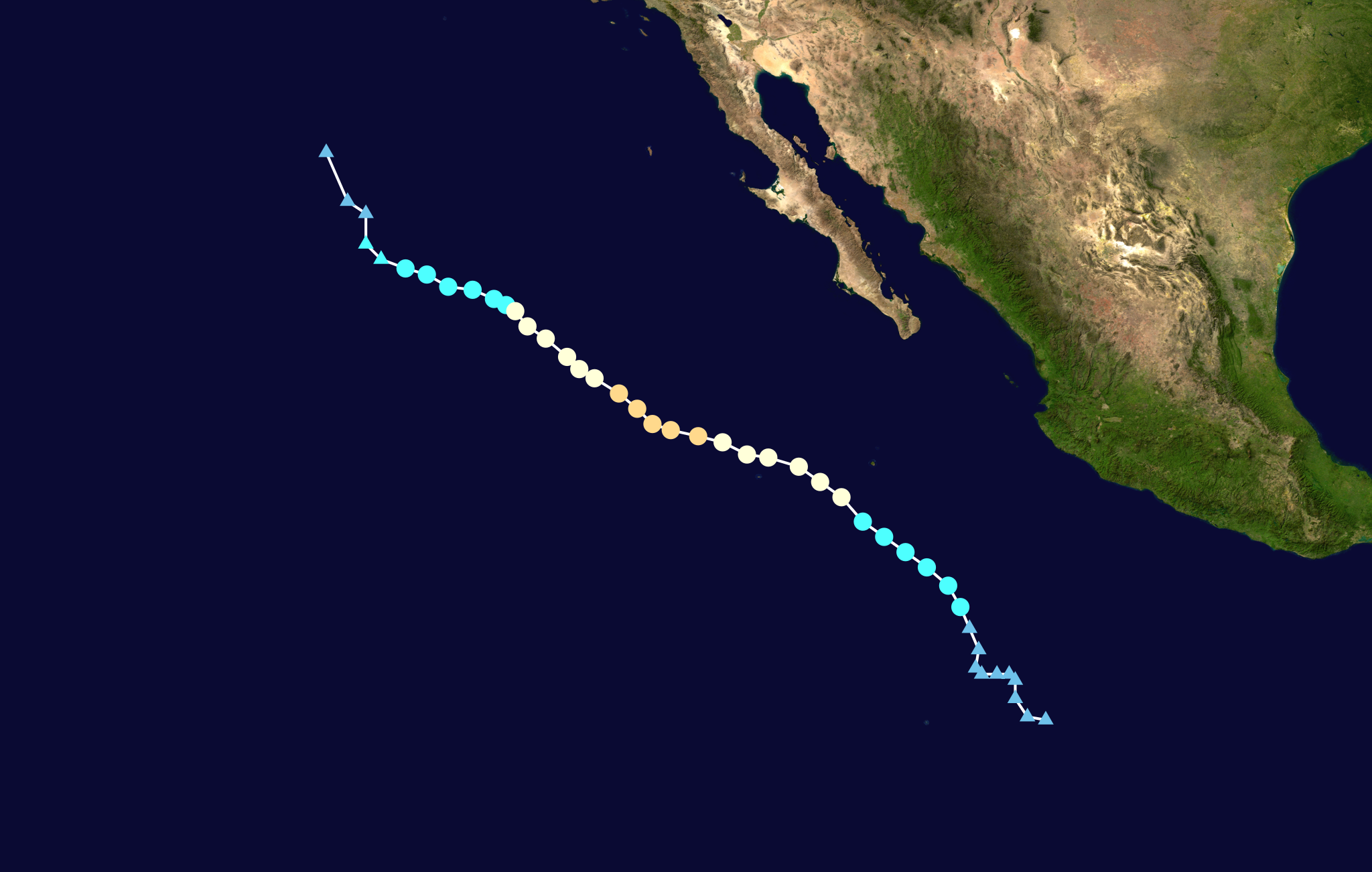
- Duration: September 1 – September 8
- Peak intensity: 100 mph (155 km/h) (1-min); 967 mbar (hPa)

On September 1, the NHC designated a low-pressure system as Tropical Storm Marie. Marie steadily intensified over the Eastern Pacific over the next day, becoming a high-end tropical storm late on September 2. On September 3 at 03:00 UTC, Marie improved its structure and intensified to a Category 1 hurricane with winds of 80 mph (130 km/h). Over the next 24 hours, Marie slowly and steadily intensified, struggling due to dry air, and it became a Category 2 hurricane on September 4, at 03:00 UTC. Marie held its intensity for 24 hours, with dry air mostly restricting the opportunity for further intensification; however, the hurricane deepened to 967 mbar (28.6 inHg) that evening. Early the following day, Marie had weakened to high-end Category 1 intensity. Cooler sea surface temperatures continued to restrict Marie from strengthening as the system fell below hurricane status. By September 8, Marie transitioned into a post-tropical cyclone.

In Ciudad Constitución, Baja California Sur, Marie dropped 100 mm (3.9 in) of rain, causing flooding on roadways. Small vessels were prohibited from leaving ports in San José del Cabo. Classes were also cancelled in Los Cabos. In Southern California, Marie produced high surf that coincided with evening high tides above 7 ft (2.1 m), which flooded homes and streets in several cities. In Long Beach, the waves forced 20 oceanfront homes to evacuate after the waves damaged 12 garages and the boardwalk. In Dana Point, damage reached $58 million, after the waves left eight homes uninhabitable, including one that partially collapsed. The high waves caused widespread beach erosion in coastal California, including Newport Beach, where there were 213 water rescues over Labor Day weekend. In Malibu, lightning closed a beach, while a sinkhole led to evacuations. Metrolink cancelled service south of Laguna Niguel/Mission Viejo station due to wave damage. Parts of the Orange County Line and Inland Empire–Orange County Line, and Pacific Surfliner were suspended. A state of emergency was declared in Orange County after the storm. Marie also dropped rainfall across California, peaking at 1.56 in (40 mm) in Bel Air, while also breaking daily rainfall records in Los Angeles. Along Interstate 8, east of Alpine, winds gusted to 59 mph (95 km/h). In Glendale, over 4,400 customers lost power, and several traffic signals in Arcadia lost power. California governor Gavin Newsom declared a state of emergency for several coastal communities due to the historically strong El Niño and risk of future events like Marie. Further east, the storm also enhanced the monsoon over Nevada, Arizona, and Utah.

=== Tropical Storm Norbert ===
- Tropical storm (SSHWS)
- Duration: September 9 – September 15
- Peak intensity: 65 mph (100 km/h) (1-min); 996 mbar (hPa)

At 12:00 UTC on September 8, the NHC upgraded an area of low pressure to a high chance of developing into a tropical depression. At 21:00 UTC on September 9, scatterometer data revealed a circulation that was slightly elongated but closed, with max winds supporting 35 mph (55 km/h), prompting the designation of Tropical Depression Fourteen-E. On the next day at 09:00 UTC, the NHC upgraded the system to Tropical Storm Norbert. On September 11, Norbert reached winds of 65 mph (105 km/h) and a pressure of 996 mbar (29.4 inHg). Afterward, dry air and wind shear caused the storm to weaken throughout September 12. At 15:00 UTC on September 15, the NHC declared Norbert as a remnant low due to lacking organized deep convection.

Norbert brought rough seas and strong winds to the Revillagigedo Islands.

=== Hurricane Nolo ===
- Category 4 hurricane (SSHWS)
- Duration: September 13 – October 4 (exited basin)
- Peak intensity: 155 mph (250 km/h) (1-min); 929 mbar (hPa)

On September 13, Tropical Depression Fifteen-E developed south of the Baja California peninsula, and moved westward. Unfavorable wind shear caused the depression to degenerate into a trough early on September 16. Early on September 23, the remnants regenerated into a tropical depression in the central Pacific. Later that day, it strengthened into Tropical Storm Nolo and was named by the NHC. Nolo strengthened into a Category 1 hurricane early on September 25 and reached Category 2 strength later that day. Dry air caused it to weaken to Category 1 strength on September 26 as it passed south of the Big Island of Hawaii, but it restrengthened the following day. On September 28, Nolo intensified into a Category 4 hurricane. Increasing wind shear and dry air caused Nolo to turn sharply eastward and weaken to a tropical storm on September 30. It began reorganizing on October 2 as environmental conditions improved and regained hurricane strength at 21:00 UTC that day. Nolo rapidly intensified into a major hurricane on October 3. Nolo crossed the International Date Line late on October 4, becoming a typhoon.

A hurricane watch was issued for Hawaiʻi County late on September 23, followed by a tropical storm warning the next day. Governor Josh Green declared a state of emergency, and President Donald Trump approved a federal disaster declaration for Hawaii. Schools, offices, and several parks closed, while some residents were relocated to hotels. Heavy rainfall caused flooding, landslides, and road closures across the Big Island, including the Kohala Mountain Road and Route 11. Spencer Beach Park recorded 17.25 in (438 mm) of rain, while wind gusts reached 88 mph (142 km/h) in Olowalu. More than 16,000 customers lost power, and several communities later imposed water restrictions. The Hōlei Sea Arch at Hawaiʻi Volcanoes National Park also collapsed during the storm. Although Hurricane Nolo caused no significant damage in Hawaii, it brought minor flooding and minimal damage as it passed nearby.

=== Hurricane Odalys ===
- Category 4 hurricane (SSHWS)
- Duration: September 20 – September 27
- Peak intensity: 130 mph (215 km/h) (1-min); 946 mbar (hPa)

On September 20 at 09:00 UTC, the NHC upgraded an area of low pressure to Tropical Storm Odalys after the system exhibited an increase in convective organization. Several days later on September 22 at 09:00 UTC, amid improved structural organization, the NHC upgraded Odalys into a hurricane. Odalys further intensified into the sixth major hurricane of the season by 09:00 UTC on September 25, with winds of 115 mph (185 km/h). Later that day at 12:00 UTC, the NHC upgraded Odalys to Category 4 hurricane, with winds of 130 mph (210 km/h) and a pressure of 946 mb (27.94 inHg). Afterward, increasing southwesterly wind shear caused the inner core to decay, and the storm dropped below major hurricane intensity. Strong wind shear, dry air, and cool waters caused Odalys to rapidly weaken and transition into a post-tropical cyclone on September 27. Remnant moisture from Odalys, as well as Hurricane Polo, partially contributed to severe thunderstorms across the Southwest United States on September 28–29.

=== Hurricane Polo ===
- Category 5 hurricane (SSHWS)
- Duration: September 20 – September 30
- Peak intensity: 180 mph (285 km/h) (1-min); 892 mbar (hPa)

On September 20, Tropical Depression Seventeen-E formed off the southwest coast of Mexico. Early on the following day, the NHC upgraded the system to Tropical Storm Polo. Under favorable conditions, such as 31 °C (88 °F) waters off the coast of Mexico and limited wind shear, Polo began explosively intensifying, becoming a hurricane by 18:00 UTC and a Category 5 hurricane by 12:00 UTC the following day. Only a few hours later, it reached its initial peak intensity with winds of 180 mph (285 km/h) and a pressure of 892 mbar (26.34 inHg). An eyewall replacement cycle then caused it to weaken to Category 4, but it regained Category 5 intensity by 00:40 UTC on September 24 after completing the eyewall replacement cycle. After restrengthening, it weakened to Category 4 strength, before further weakening to a Category 3 by September 27.

The ports of Acapulco, Lázaro Cárdenas, Puerto Marqués and Zihuatanejo were closed to shipping on September 21, and classes were suspended in coastal regions of the states of Guerrero and Michoacán. In Zihuatanejo, heavy rainfall from Polo caused flooding and property damage. At least five vehicles were flooded. Polo brought hurricane-force winds and dangerous swells to the Revillagigedo Islands.

=== Hurricane Rachel ===
- Category 3 hurricane (SSHWS)
- Duration: September 27 – October 11
- Peak intensity: 120 mph (195 km/h) (1-min); 950 mbar (hPa)

At 09:00 UTC on September 27, the NHC designated an area of low pressure as Tropical Depression Eighteen-E after having a closed circulation and organized convection. Later that day at 21:00 UTC, the depression strengthened into Tropical Storm Rachel. Rachel gradually strengthened over the next few days, moving northwestward off the coast of Mexico. It reached Category 1 strength at 06:00 UTC on September 30. Rachel intensified into a Category 2 at 06:00 UTC on October 1. Favorable conditions allowed Rachel to further intensify into a Category 3 major hurricane, reaching peak intensity with 1-minute sustained winds of 120 mph (195 km/h) and a minimum pressure of 950 mbar (28.05 inHg). Afterwards, Rachel would weaken slowly as it moved westward, remaining a hurricane for six more days while fluctuating in intensity. Rachel lost hurricane-strength winds on October 8, however it began to turn northeastward the following day towards Baja California. This prompted the second-ever issuing of a tropical storm watch for California, in addition to tropical storm warnings issued across the northern portion of Baja California.

On September 30, Rachel caused flooding in Lázaro Cárdenas. Classes were cancelled in 30 municipalities across Jalisco and at the University of Guadalajara. Several streets in Puerto Vallarta were closed due to storm surge flooding. The Malecón Boardwalk was also closed for several days due to rough waves. A beachfront shop was compromised due to damage from waves in Puerto Vallarta, as well. Rachel brought hurricane-force winds to the Revillagigedo Islands and generated rough seas across the western coast of Baja California peninsula. In Mohave County, Arizona, heavy rainfall triggered flash flood warnings on October 11, and wind gusts reached 63 mph (101 km/h) at the Lake Havasu City Airport. In California, Long Beach Mayor Rex Richardson stated that eight structures across 13 addresses were marked as unsafe to be occupied due to high surf and severe coastal erosion on October 10. Las Vegas broke their daily rainfall record for October 11 and tied their wettest October day on record with 1.08 in (27 mm) of rain. Eight people were killed by the storm. As of October 2026, Arthur J. Gallagher & Co. estimated losses to be more than US$200 million.

=== Tropical Depression Nineteen-E ===
- Tropical depression (SSHWS)
- Duration: September 29 – October 1
- Peak intensity: 35 mph (55 km/h) (1-min); 1002 mbar (hPa)

On September 23, the NHC began tracking an area of interest located well east-southeast of Hawaii. Three days later, an area of low pressure formed and became more organized as it moved to the northeast. The NHC upgraded the system to Tropical Depression Nineteen-E at 15:00 UTC on September 29 as it developed deep convection and an organized circulation. Facing wind shear and dry air, the system's convection largely deteriorated hours later, and its low-level center became exposed. The following day, convection began to re-organize, and the depression re-strengthened slightly, in spite of hostile conditions. However, the strengthening was brief, as the system began to deteriorate shortly after. The system then opened up to a trough on October 1.

=== Hurricane Simon ===
- Category 4 hurricane (SSHWS)
- Duration: October 7 – October 16
- Peak intensity: 155 mph (250 km/h) (1-min); 928 mbar (hPa)

On September 29, the NHC began tracking an area of interest south of southern Mexico. On October 7, the NHC upgraded the low to a depression, assigning it the designation Twenty-E. Later that day, the depression intensified to a tropical storm and was given the name Simon. On October 9 at 03:00 UTC, the NHC upgraded the system to a hurricane. The system then rapidly intensified into a Category 2 hurricane due to favorable conditions. It was noted at this time that the system was highly compact with a characteristic pinhole eye, with a radius of maximum winds of about five nautical miles. Simon further strengthened into a high-end Category 4 hurricane, with sustained winds of 155 mph (250 km/h) and a pressure of 928 mbar (27.40 inHg).

Aon plc estimated that losses from Simon totaled to more than US$10 million and that five people were killed by the storm.

=== Hurricane Trudy ===
- Category 3 hurricane (SSHWS)
- Duration: October 13 – October 20
- Peak intensity: 120 mph (195 km/h) (1-min); 956 mbar (hPa)

On October 6, the NHC noted that an area of interest south of Guatemala formed. On October 13, the NHC upgraded the low to a tropical depression, designating it as Twenty-One-E. Later that day, the depression intensified into a tropical storm and was given the name Trudy. Then, on October 15, it intensified into a hurricane. The next morning Trudy intensified to Category 3 strength, with sustained winds of 120 mph (195 km/h), then unexpectedly weakened to Category 1 intensity later the same day. Favorable conditions allowed Trudy to restrengthen slightly to Category 2 the following day, but it began rapidly weakening on October 18 as a result of dry air and increased wind shear and dissipated the next day.

=== Hurricane Vance ===
- Category 3 hurricane (SSHWS)
- Duration: October 21 – October 30
- Peak intensity: 115 mph (185 km/h) (1-min); 961 mbar (hPa)

On October 14, the NHC began tracking an area of interest southwest of Mexico. On the afternoon of October 21, it organized into a tropical depression and became Twenty-Two-E. The depression intensified into a tropical storm soon thereafter, receiving the name Vance. At the time, it was located about 520 mi (835 km) south of Acapulco, Guerrero. Vance then became increasingly well organized, and it attained hurricane status as a Category 1 early on October 23 and rapidly intensified, reaching its short-lived peak intensity as a Category 3 major hurricane between 21:00 UTC October 23 and 03:00 UTC October 24. Vance then began to weaken, losing hurricane status late on October 25 and was downgraded to a tropical depression on October 28 at 21:00 UTC. Vance then briefly restrengthened, gaining tropical storm status at 09:00 UTC October 29, but weakened into a tropical depression again at 21:00 UTC the same day. On October 30, Vance degenerated into a remnant low.

In Guaymas, one person was swept away by an overflowing river and drowned.

=== Tropical Storm Olana ===
- Tropical storm (SSHWS)
- Duration: October 25 (entered basin) – October 27
- Peak intensity: 45 mph (75 km/h) (1-min); 1000 mbar (hPa)

On October 21, the NHC noted a disturbance just west of the International Date Line. On October 24, the Japan Meteorological Agency (JMA) began tracking the system as a low pressure area. The following day, the JMA marked it as a tropical depression. Later on October 25, both the JMA and NHC reported that it entered the central Pacific. The NHC soon classified the system as a tropical depression and designated it Three-C. It then intensified into a tropical storm and was named Olana at 21:00 UTC. Olana maintained its intensity until the following day, when it weakened into a depression at 15:00 UTC. Olana then degenerated into a remnant low on October 27 at 03:00 UTC.

=== Tropical Storm Pena ===
- Tropical storm (SSHWS)
- Duration: November 6 – November 12
- Peak intensity: 60 mph (95 km/h) (1-min); 996 mbar (hPa)

On October 28, the NHC began monitoring an area for potential tropical development. On November 6, the system organized into a tropical storm, receiving the name Pena. Pena then strengthened, reaching its peak intensity on November 8 at 03:00 UTC. Pena weakened immediately after reaching its peak intensity, surviving as a weak tropical storm while it moved westward. Pena then degenerated into a tropical depression and further into a remnant low on November 12, at 09:00 UTC and 15:00 UTC respectively.

== Storm names ==
The following list of names is being used for named storms that form in the North Pacific Ocean east of 140°W during 2026. This is the same list used in the 2020 season.

- Amanda
- Boris
- Cristina
- Douglas
- Elida
- Fausto*
- Genevieve
- Hernan
- Iselle
- Julio
- Karina*
- Lowell*
- Marie
- Norbert
- Odalys
- Polo
- Rachel
- Simon
- Trudy
- Vance
- Winnie (unused)
- Xavier (unused)
- Yolanda (unused)
- Zeke (unused)

For storms that form in the North Pacific from 140°W to the International Date Line, the names come from a series of four rotating lists. Names are used one after the other without regard to year, and when the bottom of one list is reached, the next named storm receives the name at the top of the next list. Five named storms, listed below, have formed within the area in 2026. Named storms in the table above that cross into the area during the season are noted (*).

- Lala
- Moke
- Nolo
- Olana
- Pena

== Season effects ==
The following is a table which includes all of the storms that have formed in the 2026 Pacific hurricane season. It includes their duration, names, intensities, areas affected, damages, and death totals. Deaths in parentheses are additional and indirect (an example of an indirect death would be a traffic accident), but were still related to that storm. Damage and deaths include totals while the storm was extratropical, a wave, or a low, and all of the damage figures are in 2026 USD.

Saffir–Simpson scale
TD	TS	C1	C2	C3	C4	C5

2026 Pacific hurricane season season statistics
Storm name	Dates active	Storm category at peak intensity	Max 1-min wind mph (km/h)	Min. press. (mbar)	Areas affected	Damage (US$)	Deaths	Ref(s).
Amanda	June 2–7	Tropical storm	50 (85)	1003	None	None	None	
Boris	June 7–9	Tropical storm	50 (85)	1000	Southern Mexico	$100 million	5	
Cristina	June 8–10	Tropical storm	50 (85)	1002	Central America, Southern Mexico	>$150,000	7	
Douglas	July 1–3	Tropical storm	40 (65)	1003	None	None	None	
Elida	July 14–20	Tropical storm	70 (110)	990	Clarion Island, Coastal California	None	None	
Fausto	July 19–29	Category 2 hurricane	105 (165)	967	Revillagigedo Islands, Hawaiian Islands, Coastal California	None	None	
Genevieve	July 24 – August 2	Category 5 hurricane	160 (260)	924	Revillagigedo Islands, Baja California peninsula, Southwestern Mexico, Coastal California	None	None	
Hernan	August 12–15	Tropical storm	45 (75)	1003	None	None	None	
Lala	August 13–28	Category 4 hurricane	130 (215)	947	Hawaii, Papahānaumokuākea Marine National Monument	$1 billion	3 (1)	
Moke	August 20–25	Tropical storm	50 (85)	994	Hawaiian Islands	None	None	
Iselle	August 23–26	Tropical storm	70 (110)	987	Revillagigedo Islands, Baja California peninsula	None	None	
Julio	August 24–25	Tropical storm	50 (85)	1000	None	None	None	
Karina	August 27 – September 7	Category 4 hurricane	145 (230)	940	Revillagigedo Islands	None	None	
Lowell	August 27 – September 11	Category 5 hurricane	160 (260)	922	Hawaiian Islands	$400 million	3	
Marie	September 1–8	Category 2 hurricane	100 (155)	967	Revillagigedo Islands, Baja California peninsula, Southwestern Mexico, Coastal California	Unknown	None	
Norbert	September 9–15	Tropical storm	65 (100)	996	Revillagigedo Islands	None	None	
Nolo	September 13 – October 4	Category 4 hurricane	155 (250)	929	Clarion Island, Hawaii, Papahānaumokuākea Marine National Monument (before crossover)	Unknown	None	
Odalys	September 20–27	Category 4 hurricane	130 (215)	946	None	None	None	
Polo	September 20–30	Category 5 hurricane	180 (285)	892	Southwestern Mexico, Revillagigedo Islands, Baja California peninsula, Northwestern Mexico, West South Central states	>$100 million	8+	
Rachel	September 27 – October 11	Category 3 hurricane	120 (195)	950	Southwestern Mexico, Revillagigedo Islands, Baja California peninsula, Western United States	>$200 million	8	
Nineteen-E	September 29 – October 1	Tropical depression	35 (55)	1002	None	None	None	
Simon	October 7–16	Category 4 hurricane	155 (250)	928	Southwestern Mexico, Islas Marías	>$10 million	5	
Trudy	October 13–20	Category 3 hurricane	120 (195)	956	Southwestern Mexico, Islas Marías	Unknown	None	
Vance	October 21–30	Category 3 hurricane	115 (185)	961	Southwestern Mexico, Northwestern Mexico	Unknown	1	
Olana	October 25–27	Tropical storm	45 (75)	1000	None	None	None	
Pena	November 6–12	Tropical storm	60 (95)	996	None	None	None	
Season aggregates
25 systems	June 2 – Season ongoing		180 (285)	892		>$1.81 billion	40 (1)	

== See also ==
- Weather of 2026
- Tropical cyclones in 2026
- 2026 Atlantic hurricane season
- 2026 Pacific typhoon season
- 2026 North Indian Ocean cyclone season
- South-West Indian Ocean cyclone seasons: 2025–26, 2026–27
- Australian region cyclone seasons: 2025–26, 2026–27
- South Pacific cyclone seasons: 2025–26, 2026–27
