= Hurricane Frank (2010) =

Category 1 Pacific hurricane in 2010

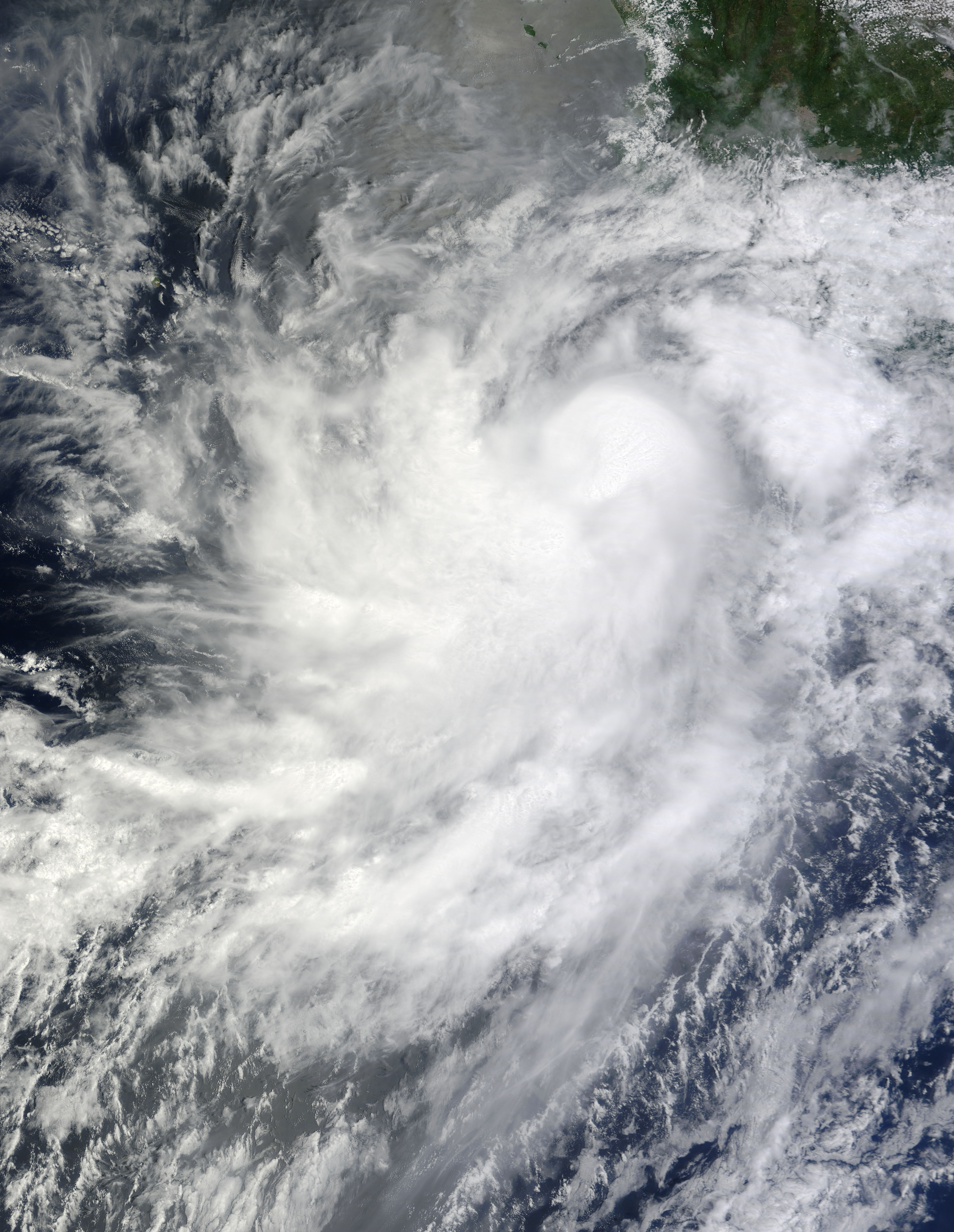
- Frank off the Mexican coast on August 25.

Meteorological history
- Formed: August 21, 2010
- Remnant low: August 28, 2010
- Dissipated: August 29, 2010

Category 1 hurricane
- 1-minute sustained (SSHWS/NWS)
- Highest winds: 90 mph (150 km/h)
- Lowest pressure: 978 mbar (hPa); 28.88 inHg

Overall effects
- Fatalities: 6
- Damage: $8.3 million
- Areas affected: Southwestern Mexico, Western Mexico
- IBTrACS /
- Part of the 2010 Pacific hurricane season

Hurricane Frank was a Category 1 hurricane that caused minor damage in Mexico in late August 2010. The ninth tropical cyclone, sixth named storm, and final of a record low three hurricanes of the inactive 2010 Pacific hurricane season, Frank formed from an area of thunderstorms from the Caribbean Sea, and became Tropical Depression Nine-E on August 21 while located just south of the Mexican Coast. It moved northwest, and became Tropical Storm Frank only 12 hours after it was declared a depression. It strengthened to its initial peak as a moderate tropical storm, and weakened due to increasing wind shear late on the August 23. It later recovered, and became a hurricane on August 25. After peaking as a strong Category 1 hurricane, it rapidly weakened, and dissipated on August 28. Although Frank never made landfall, it did impact western Mexico. A total of six people were killed with over 800,000 people affected.

== Meteorological history ==
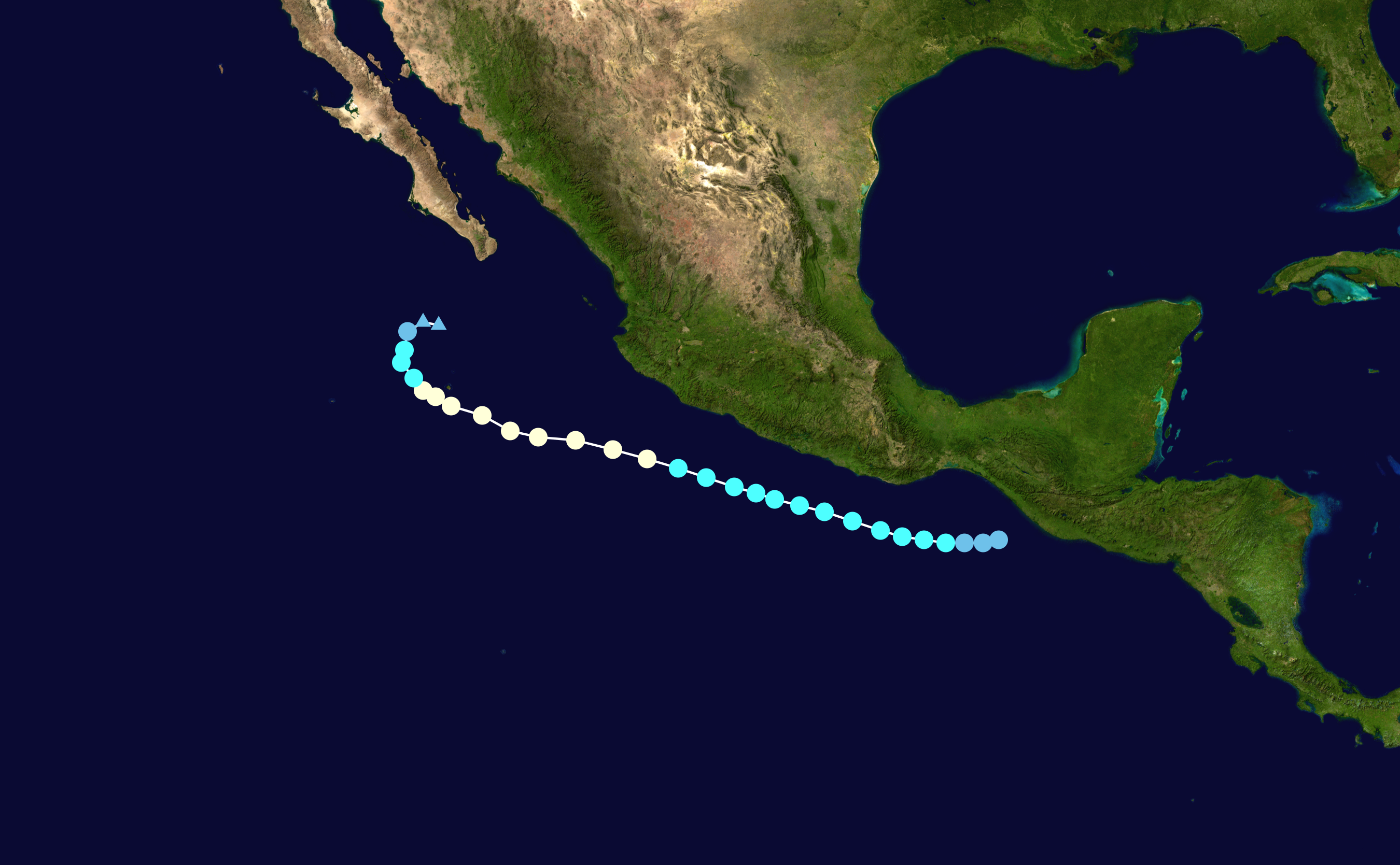
Map plotting the storm's track and intensity, according to the Saffir–Simpson scale Map key Saffir–Simpson scale Tropical depression (≤38 mph, ≤62 km/h) Tropical storm (39–73 mph, 63–118 km/h) Category 1 (74–95 mph, 119–153 km/h) Category 2 (96–110 mph, 154–177 km/h) Category 3 (111–129 mph, 178–208 km/h) Category 4 (130–156 mph, 209–251 km/h) Category 5 (≥157 mph, ≥252 km/h) Unknown Storm type Tropical cyclone Subtropical cyclone Extratropical cyclone, remnant low, tropical disturbance, or monsoon depression

Frank originated from a difficult to track tropical wave that moved off the west coast of Africa. A large area of thunderstorms formed near the Windward Islands. Atmosphere convection fluctuated as its associated tropical wave moved across the Caribbean Sea and a mid-level circulation developed. Shower and thunderstorm activity increased as it crossed Central America, and a broad area of low pressure formed about 115 mi (185 km) south of the Mexican coast on August 19. The system was in a favorable environment, thus gradual development was anticipated. On August 21, the atmospheric convection had become better organized, and it develop curved rainbands. On 1800 UTC August 21, advisories were initiated on Tropical Depression Nine-E while located roughly 205 mi (330 km) southeast of Salina Cruz, Mexico.

Upon becoming a tropical cyclone, the storm was located in a favorable environment with sea surface temperatures near 30 °C (86 °F) and fairly weak wind shear. As such, the National Hurricane Center (NHC) anticipated the storm to reach minimal hurricane intensity. Due to weak steering currents, the depression drifted westbound. Initially there was no change in organization, but on August 22, the cloud patterns improved. Based on estimates from the Tropical Analysis and Forecast Branch (TAFB), the depression was upgraded into Tropical Storm Frank on 1200 UTC August 22. Although deep convection had weakened, the NHC re-assessed the intensity at 60 mph (95 km/h) later that day. However, high levels of northeasterly wind shear caused the system to weaken slightly the next day, and by early August 24, the NHC was no longer forecasting the storm to become a hurricane. Despite the shear, there was a burst of deep convection later that day and a gradual increase in organization. Microwave imagery at 0834 and 1714 UTC showed a closed ring of thunderstorm activity that resembled an eye and by early August 25, the cyclone was just below hurricane intensity.

During the next six hours, Frank became much better organized with a large area of very deep convection near the center. Based on this, the NHC upgraded the system into a hurricane. Gradually intensifying, an eye became intermediately visible on infrared imagery and a persistent eye was visible via microwave imagery. On 1800 UTC, Frank reached its peak intensity of 90 mph (150 km/h) and 978 mbar (hPa; 28.88 inHg) while located 350 mi (560 km) south of the southern tip of the Baja California Peninsula. While at peak intensity, satellite imagery showed a small but distinct eye surrounded by a central dense overcast, or a large area of thunderstorm activity. Moving west-northwest, Frank began a weakening trend overnight as the eye became less defined. Continuing to weaken, Frank became less organized and its eye collapsed. On August 27, the NHC downgraded Frank into a tropical storm, with poorly organized convection located west of the center due to strong wind shear. As such, the agency predicted the storm to weaken into a tropical depression within the next 36 hours. Frank rapidly lost all thunderstorm activity because of cooler water, and the storms intensity was reduced to a swirl of clouds while it turned towards the north due to a mid-level trough. The cyclone weakened back into a tropical depression early on August 28. Frank degenerated into a remnant low while located 230 mi (370 km) southwest of the southern tip of Baja California. The remnant low dissipated early on August 29.

== Preparations, impact, and aftermath ==
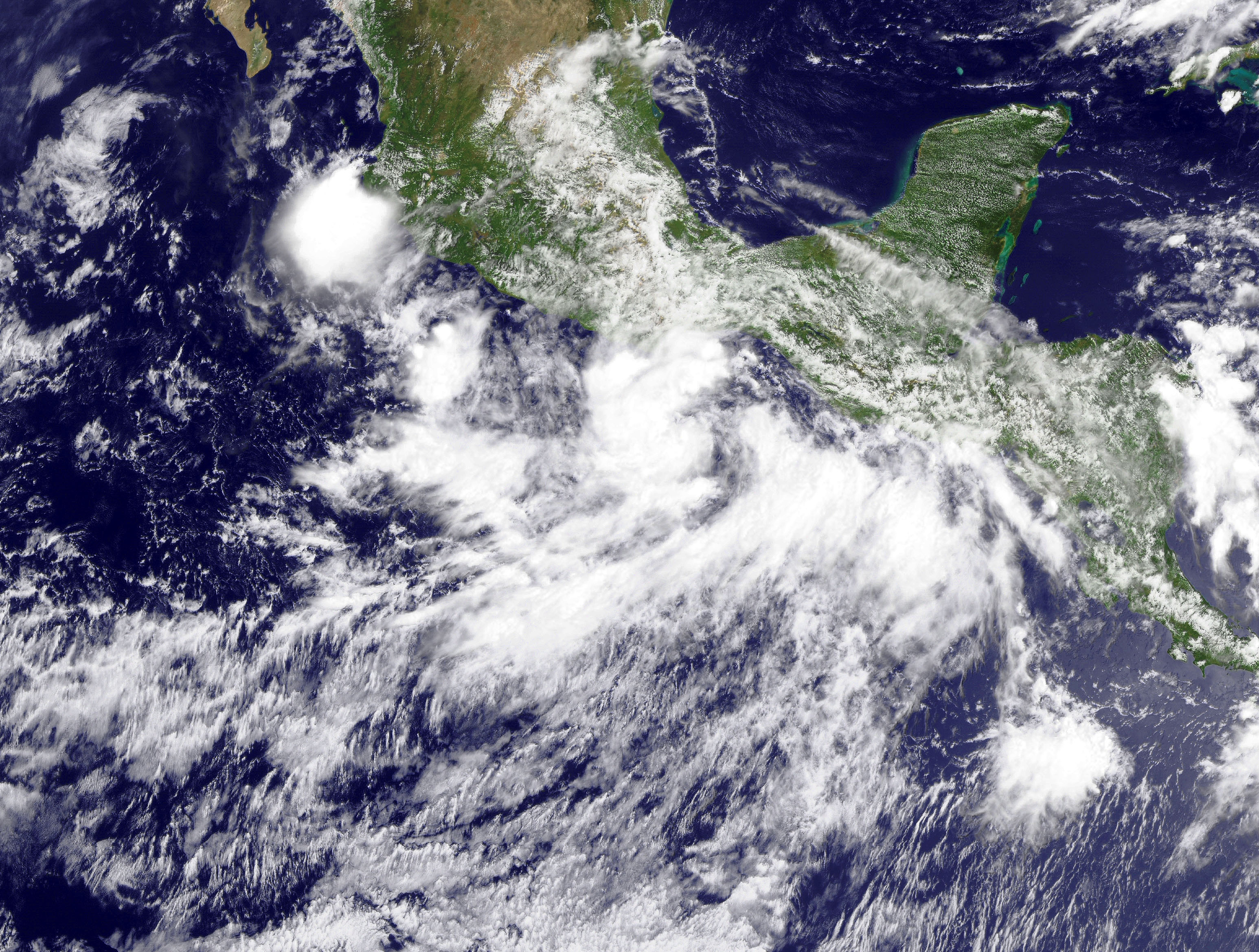
Tropical Storm Frank shortly after being named on August 22.

The storm led to a tropical storm warnings for the Mexican coast from Puerto Ángel to Tecpan de Galeana. Officials gave Frank a hazard rating of intense for the Mexican Pacific, and strong for Baja California Sur. In Guerrero, Michoacán, and Jalisco, alerts were issued due to the threat of torrential rainfall.

The maximum 24-hour rainfall total was 14 in (360 mm) in Miguel de la Madrid, Oaxaca. In addition, seven other sites received more than 4 in (100 mm) of rain in a 24-hour period. The storm also produced gusty conditions along the Mexican coast. In addition, a total of six deaths were reported. A total 30 homes were destroyed with 26 others damaged due to flooding. Two major roads were damaged with another road blocked due to a landslides. Several rivers overflowed their banks, thus causing 171 rural communities to be flooded in seven municipalities. In the state of Tabasco over 800,000 people were affected. The city of Villahermosa received the worst flood since 2007, and a total of 8,500 people were victims of the storm. In Oaxaca, four people were killed. A mudslide in the municipality of Totontepec Villa de Morelos caused two farmers to die. Another mudslide in Oaxaca caused six vehicles to drive off Federal Highway 182, causing two more deaths. A total of 60,000 people were homeless. Many communities were isolated as several bridges and roads were destroyed due to the heavy rainfall.

In the aftermath of the storm, the Mexican Army provided aid for the people affected. A total of 110 communities requested assistance from the government. By September 14, an estimated 200,000 food packages were distributed to the region. Damage repairs from Hurricane Frank totaled to 100 million pesos (US$8.3 million).

== See also ==
- Other storms of the same name
