= 2010 Pacific hurricane season =

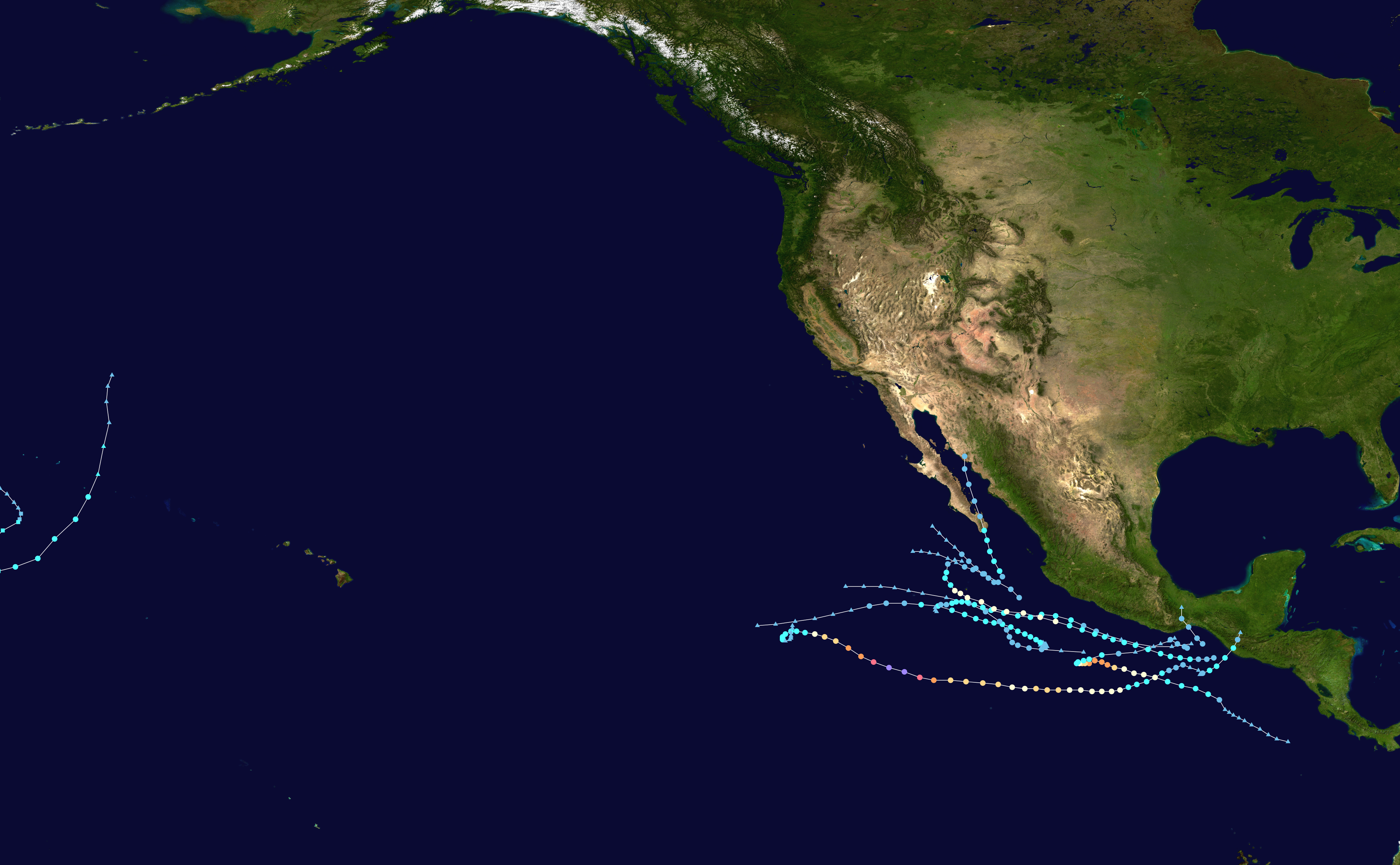
- Season summary map

Seasonal boundaries
- First system formed: May 29, 2010
- Last system dissipated: December 21, 2010

Strongest storm
- Name: Celia
  - Maximum winds: 160 mph (260 km/h) (1-minute sustained)
  - Lowest pressure: 921 mbar (hPa; 27.2 inHg)

Seasonal statistics
- Total depressions: 13
- Total storms: 8 (record low, tied with 1977)
- Hurricanes: 3 (record low)
- Major hurricanes (Cat. 3+): 2
- ACE: 52.0
- Total fatalities: 268 total
- Total damage: $1.62 billion (2010 USD)

Related articles
- Timeline of the 2010 Pacific hurricane season; 2010 Atlantic hurricane season; 2010 Pacific typhoon season; 2010 North Indian Ocean cyclone season

The 2010 Pacific hurricane season was the least active Pacific hurricane season on record (reliable records began in 1971), tied with 1977 season. The season accumulated the second-fewest ACE units on record, as many of the tropical cyclones were weak and short-lived. Altogether, only three of the season's eight named storms strengthened into hurricanes. Of those, two became major hurricanes, with one, Celia, reaching Category 5 intensity on the Saffir-Simpson scale. Despite the inactivity, however, it was the costliest Pacific hurricane season on record at the time, mostly due to Tropical Storm Agatha. The season officially began on May 15 in the eastern North Pacific (east 140°W) and on June 1 in the central North Pacific (from 140°W to the International Date Line). It ended in both regions on November 30. These dates, adopted by convention, historically describe the period in each year when most tropical cyclogenesis occurs in these regions of the Pacific. However, the formation of tropical cyclones is possible at any time of the year, as evidenced by the formation of Tropical Storm Omeka on December 19.

The first system of the season, Agatha, developed on May 29 near the coast of Guatemala. In the second week of June, a sudden spree of tropical cyclones developed, and between June 16 and 22, four cyclones formed, including the two major hurricanes of the season, Celia and Darby, the first of which reached Category 5 intensity. This near-record activity was a reversal from the previous season, when no storm formed until June 18. Following this activity, July saw zero named storms. In August and September only 2 tropical storms and one hurricane formed. Tropical Depression Eleven-E caused a great deal of flooding in southern Mexico, causing millions of dollars in damage, as well as causing over 50 deaths and $500 million in damage in areas of Oaxaca and Guatemala. Tropical Storm Omeka was a rare off-season storm.

== Seasonal forecasts ==
Predictions of tropical activity in the 2010 season
Source	Date	Named storms	Hurricanes	Major hurricanes	Ref
Average (1981–2010)		15.4	8.4	3.9
Record high activity		27	16 (tie)	11
Record low activity		8 (tie)	3	0 (tie)
NOAA	May 27, 2010	9–15	4–8	1–3
	Actual activity	8	3	2

On May 19, 2010, the National Oceanic and Atmospheric Administration (NOAA) released their forecast for the 2010 Central Pacific hurricane season, which would start on June 1. They expected two or three cyclones to form in or enter the region throughout the season, below the average of four or five storms. The below-average activity forecast was based on two factors: the first was the continuance of a period of decreased activity in the central Pacific; and second, the effects of a Neutral El Niño–Southern Oscillation (ENSO) or La Niña, both of which reduce cyclone activity in the region. However, in light of the near-miss of Hurricane Felicia the previous year, forecasters at the Central Pacific Hurricane Center gave the public a basic message for the 2010 season, "Prepare! Watch! Act!".

On May 27, 12 days after the official start of the 2010 eastern Pacific hurricane season, NOAA released their forecast for the basin. Similar to the forecast for the central Pacific, below-average activity was expected, with nine to fifteen named storms forming, four to eight of which would become hurricanes and a further one to three would become major hurricanes. This lessened activity was based on the same two factors as the central Pacific, decreased activity since 1995 and the ENSO event. Overall, NOAA stated there was a 75% chance of below-average activity, 20% of near-normal and only a 5% chance of above-average due to a strong La Niña.

== Seasonal summary ==
Activity by month compared to averages (Note: Values are only for the Eastern Pacific (east of 140°W).)
Month	Actual activity vs. Averages (Note: Storm averages are those in parentheses.)			ACE (Note: Percentage of average ACE through the end of the month)	
Month	Storms	Hurricanes	Major	Month	Year
May	1 (0–1)	0 (0)	0 (0)	–	–
June	3 (2)	2 (1)	2 (0–1)	>300%	>300%
July	0 (3–4)	0 (2)	0 (1)	0%	107%
August	2 (4)	1 (2)	0 (1)	40%	75%
September	1 (3)	0 (2)	0 (1)	<5%	46%
October	0 (2)	0 (1)	0 (0–1)	0%	48%
November	0 (0–1)	0 (0)	0 (0)	0%	~46%
Total	7 (15)	3 (9)	2 (4)	–	~46%

=== Background ===
The Accumulated Cyclone Energy (ACE) index for the 2010 Pacific hurricane season (Eastern Pacific and Central Pacific combined) as calculated by Colorado State University using data from the National Hurricane Center was 51.2 units. (Note: The total represents the sum of the squares of the maximum sustained wind speed (knots) for every (sub)tropical storm's intensity of over 33 knots (38 mph; 61 km/h), divided by 10,000 while they are above that threshold; therefore, tropical depressions are not included.) This ranked as the second-quietest since 1966. The vast majority of the ACE stemmed from Hurricanes Celia and Darby, which collectively accounted for roughly 70 percent of the seasonal total.

Continuing a trend of below-average activity that began in 1995, the 2010 season was quiet as expected. The Eastern Pacific proper saw record-low numbers of named storms and hurricanes, with only seven and three respectively forming. Inclusive of the Central Pacific, the basin tied its record low activity of eight named storms set in 1977.

Inactivity was largely attributed to a moderately strong La Niña event which resulted in below-average sea surface temperatures across the basin. Another major factor limiting storm formation was the eastward displacement of 200 mb divergence. The displacement of this feature brought conditions that favor tropical development closer to the rugged terrain of Mexico and Central America, a factor known to disrupt low-level circulations. Accordingly, six of the seven named storms in the Eastern Pacific proper formed east of 106°W, four of which originated over the Gulf of Tehuantepec where the greatest depth of warm waters were restricted to. A final limiting factor was above-average wind shear across much of the basin east of 130°W and north of 10°N.

The record inactivity experienced in the Northeastern Pacific also took place in the Northwestern Pacific. Since reliable records began in the 1970s, there has been no precedent for both basins experiencing exceptionally low tropical cyclone formation. Moreover, this general lack of storm formation was reflected in all cyclone basins except the Atlantic. On average, the Northeastern Pacific accounts for 16 percent of the world's storms; however, during 2010, it accounted for roughly 10 percent (7 out of 67 cyclones).

Least intense Pacific hurricane seasons
Rank	Season	ACE value
1	1977	22.3
2	2010	51.2
3	2007	51.6
4	1996	53.9
5	2003	56.6
6	1979	57.4
7	2004	71.1
8	1981	72.8
9	2013	74.8
10	2020	77.3

=== Early to peak intensity ===
List of costliest Pacific hurricane seasons
Rank	Cost	Season
1	≥$13.1 billion	2023
2	$4.47 billion	2013
3	≥$3.15 billion	1992
4	$2.46 billion	2024
5	≥$2.09 billion	2014
6	≥$1.64 billion	2018
7	$1.62 billion	2010
8	$1.31 billion	1982
9	$850 million	1998
10	$816.33 million	1983

The season began with record-high activity, featuring two major hurricanes in June. ACE values exceeded 300 percent of the long-term mean, though most was due to Category 5 Hurricane Celia. Hurricane Celia was also the second-earliest forming storm of that intensity during the course of a season, surpassed only by Hurricane Ava in 1973. The month featured an ACE value of 37.22, eclipsing the previous record set in 1984. Furthermore, Darby was the earliest second major hurricane of a season, eclipsing Hurricane Daniel (1978); however, this has since been surpassed by Cristina in 2014, Blanca in 2015, and Bud in 2018. This activity abruptly halted and languished throughout the month of July. No named storms developed during the month, marking the first such occurrence since 1966. However, due to the activity in June, ACE value for the season by the start of August remained slightly above normal, roughly 107 percent the yearly mean.

=== Late activity ===
Through the remainder of the season, the basin observed record low activity with only three additional named storms developing. Since Omeka was the first storm in the Central Pacific during the year, it marked the latest start to a season since reliable records began, excluding seasons with no storms.

== Systems ==
=== Tropical Storm Agatha ===
- Tropical storm (SSHWS)
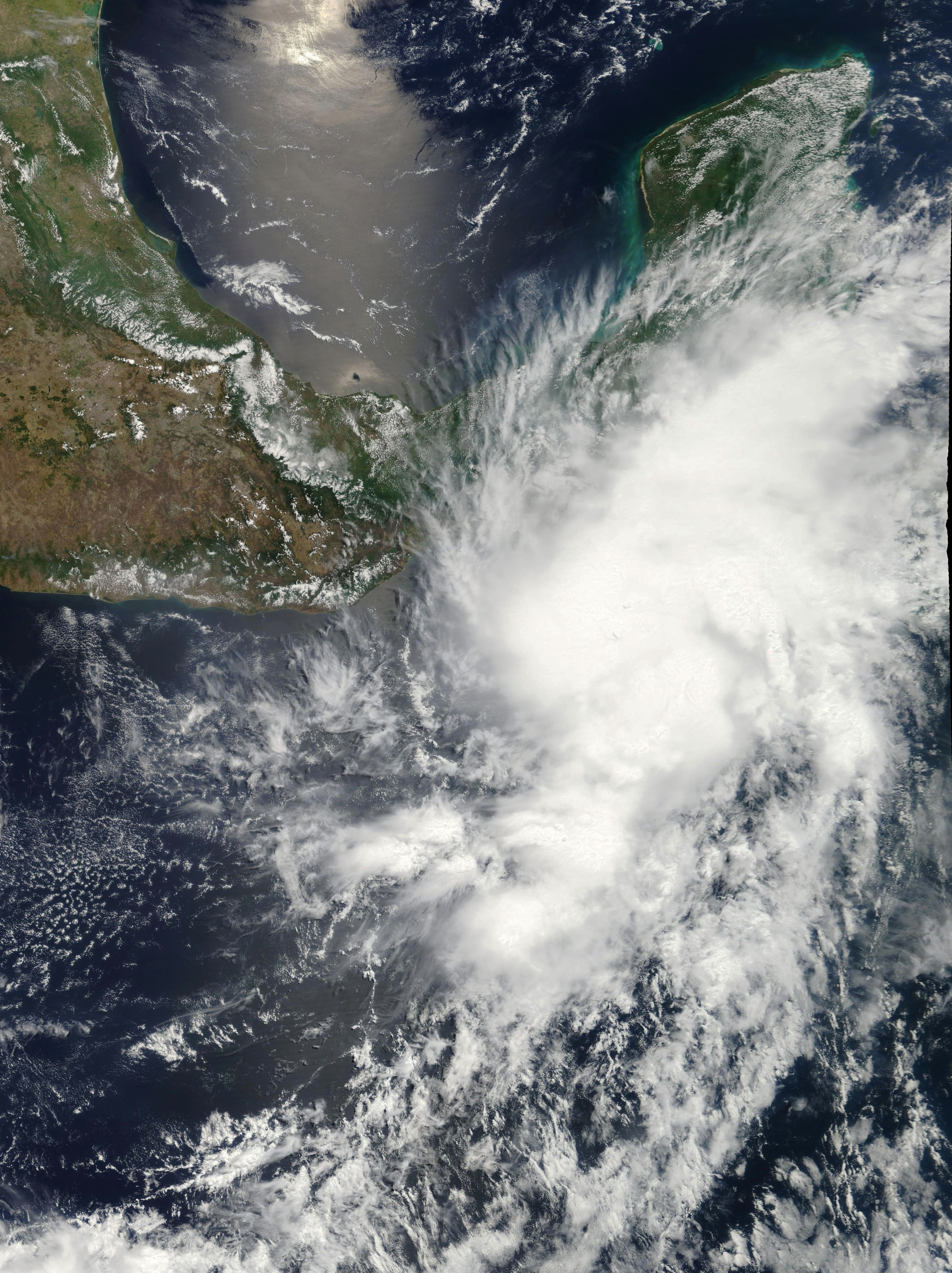
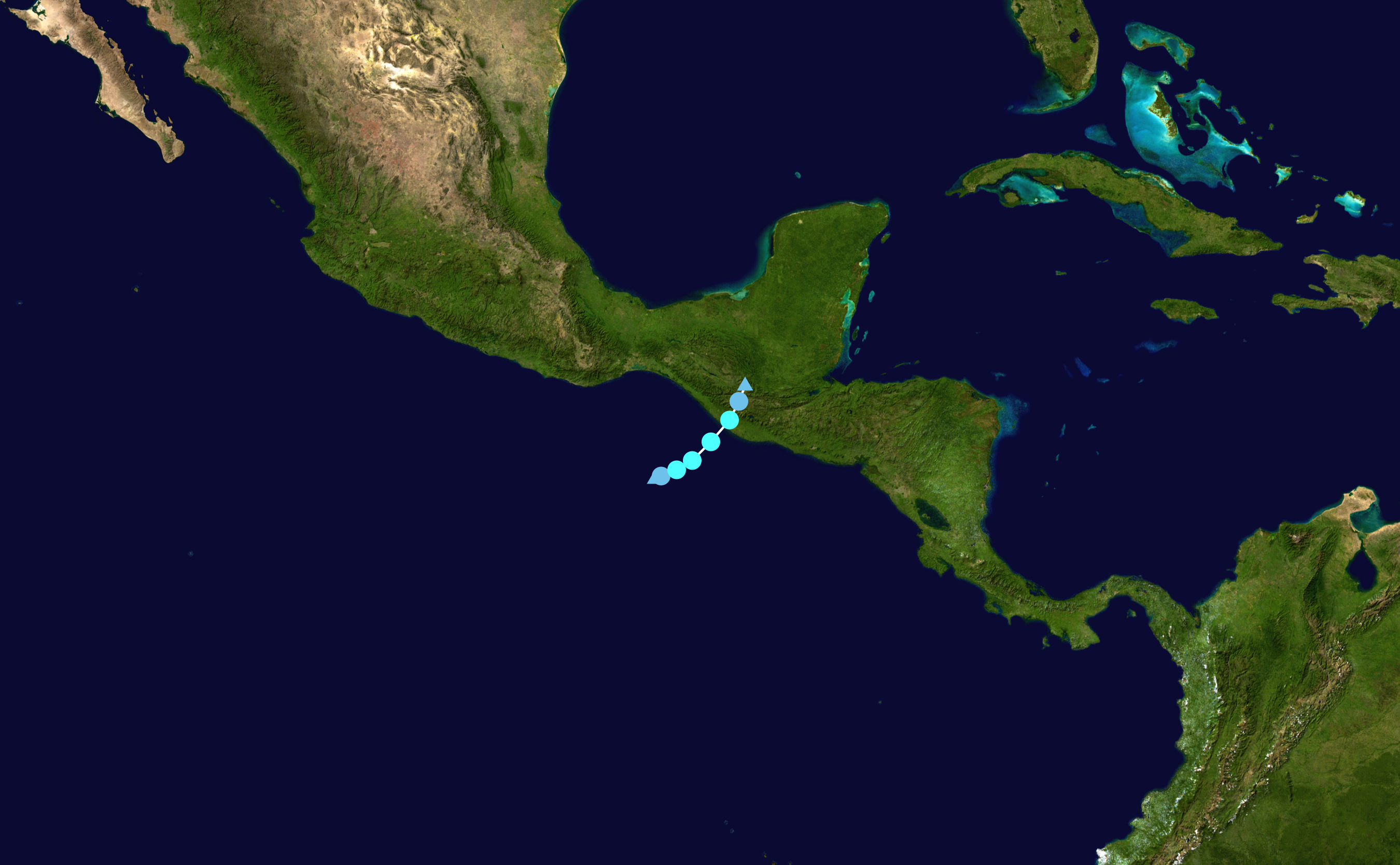
- Duration: May 29 – May 30
- Peak intensity: 45 mph (75 km/h) (1-min); 1001 mbar (hPa)

Early May 29, the season's first tropical depression consolidated near the Gulf of Tehuantepec. Large-scale southwesterly flow prompted the system to move slowly northeast. Scatterometer data indicated the depression soon strengthened into a tropical storm, at which time it was assigned the name Agatha. Attaining peak winds of 45 mph (70 km/h), Agatha soon made landfall late on May 29 near Champerico, Guatemala, just south of the border with Mexico. Once onshore, the mountainous terrain of Guatemala caused the storm to quickly dissipate early on May 30.

Although a weak tropical cyclone, Agatha brought torrential rainfall to much of Central America. Daily accumulations peaked at 16.78 in (426 mm) in Montufar, Guatemala and 19.0 in (483 mm) in Ilopango, El Salvador. According to Guatemala's president, Álvaro Colom, some areas received more than 3.3 ft (1 m) of rain. The ensuing flash floods and landslides proved catastrophic, especially in Guatemala where at least 174 people died. In El Salvador, 11 people were killed and damage from the storm reached $112.1 million. Honduras also suffered significant losses from the storm with 18 fatalities and at least $18.5 million in damage. One person was also killed in Nicaragua. The storm also associated with a very large sinkhole.

=== Tropical Depression Two-E ===
- Tropical depression (SSHWS)
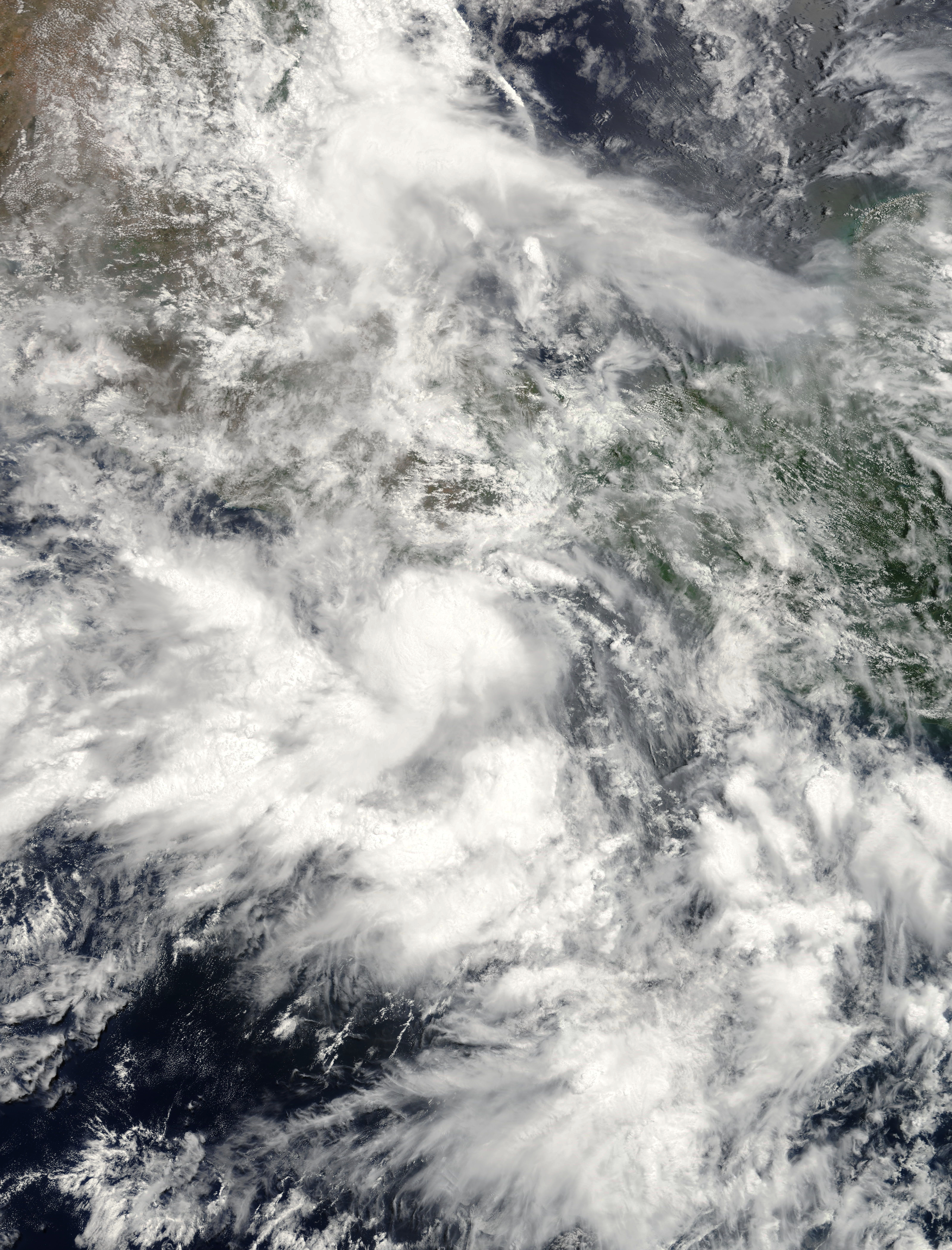
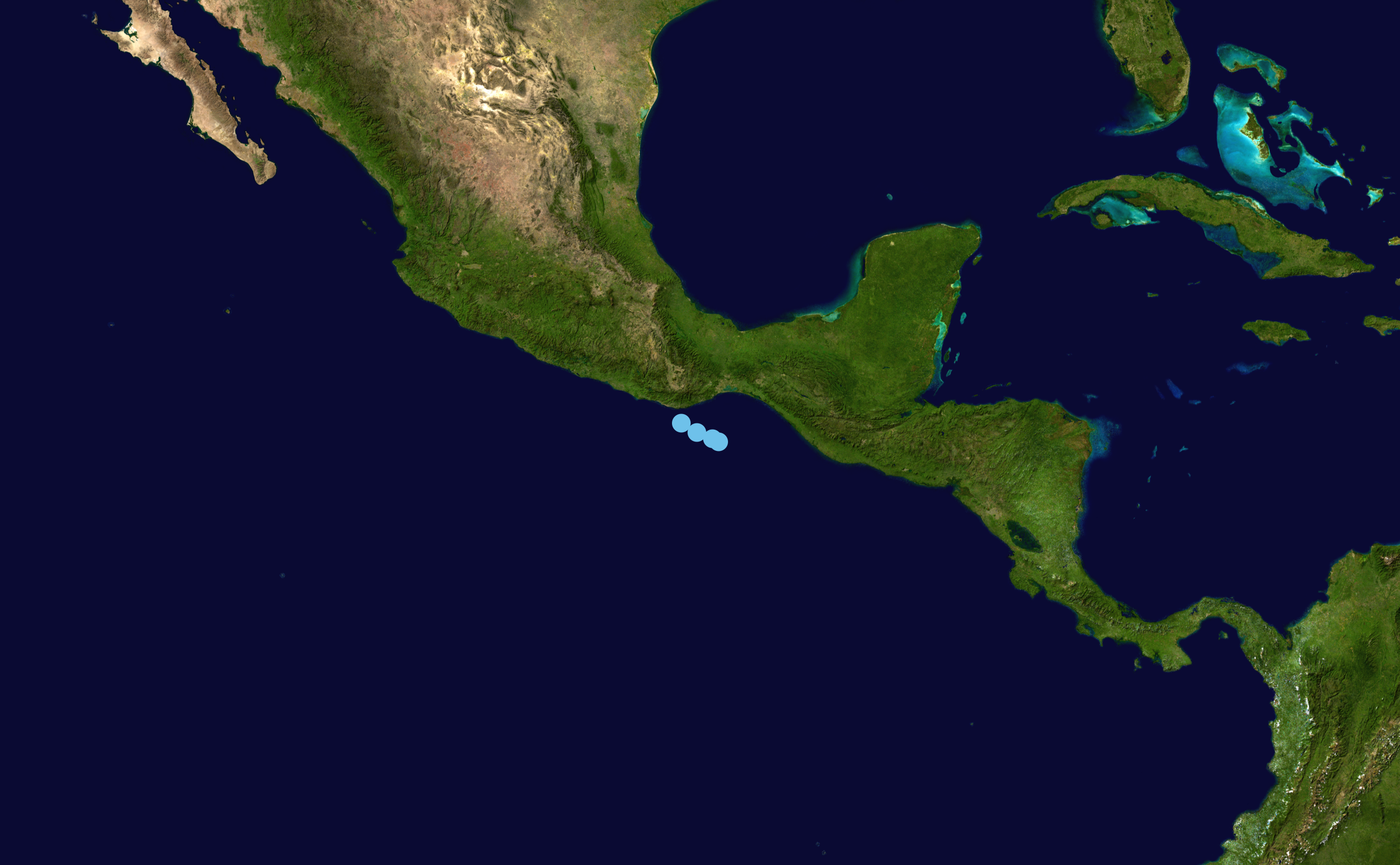
- Duration: June 16 – June 17
- Peak intensity: 35 mph (55 km/h) (1-min); 1007 mbar (hPa)

A tropical wave emerged off the west coast of Africa on June 2 and entered the Atlantic Ocean. Tracking westward, the system eventually reached the eastern Pacific on June 13. As it approached the Gulf of Tehuantepec, convection increased, despite strong wind shear. Early on June 16, sufficient development had taken place for the NHC to classify the wave as a tropical depression, at which time the depression was situated roughly 110 mi (175 km) south of Salina Cruz, Mexico. A scatterometer pass over the storm revealed it to have attained peak winds of 35 mph (55 km/h) later that day. Thereafter, wind shear took its toll on the system and its low-level circulation ultimately dissipated early on June 17 while still off the coast of Mexico.

Due to its proximity to land, tropical storm watches and warnings were issued in advance of the storm when the system was first classified. This was discontinued when the system dissipated. Rainfall associated with the depression extended as far north as Oaxaca. In San Juan Bautista Tuxtepec, 82 homes were damaged by flood waters and 40 others were affected in the town of Zimatlán de Alvarez. Some homes lost their roofs and a few trees were downed as a result of high winds.

=== Tropical Storm Blas ===
- Tropical storm (SSHWS)
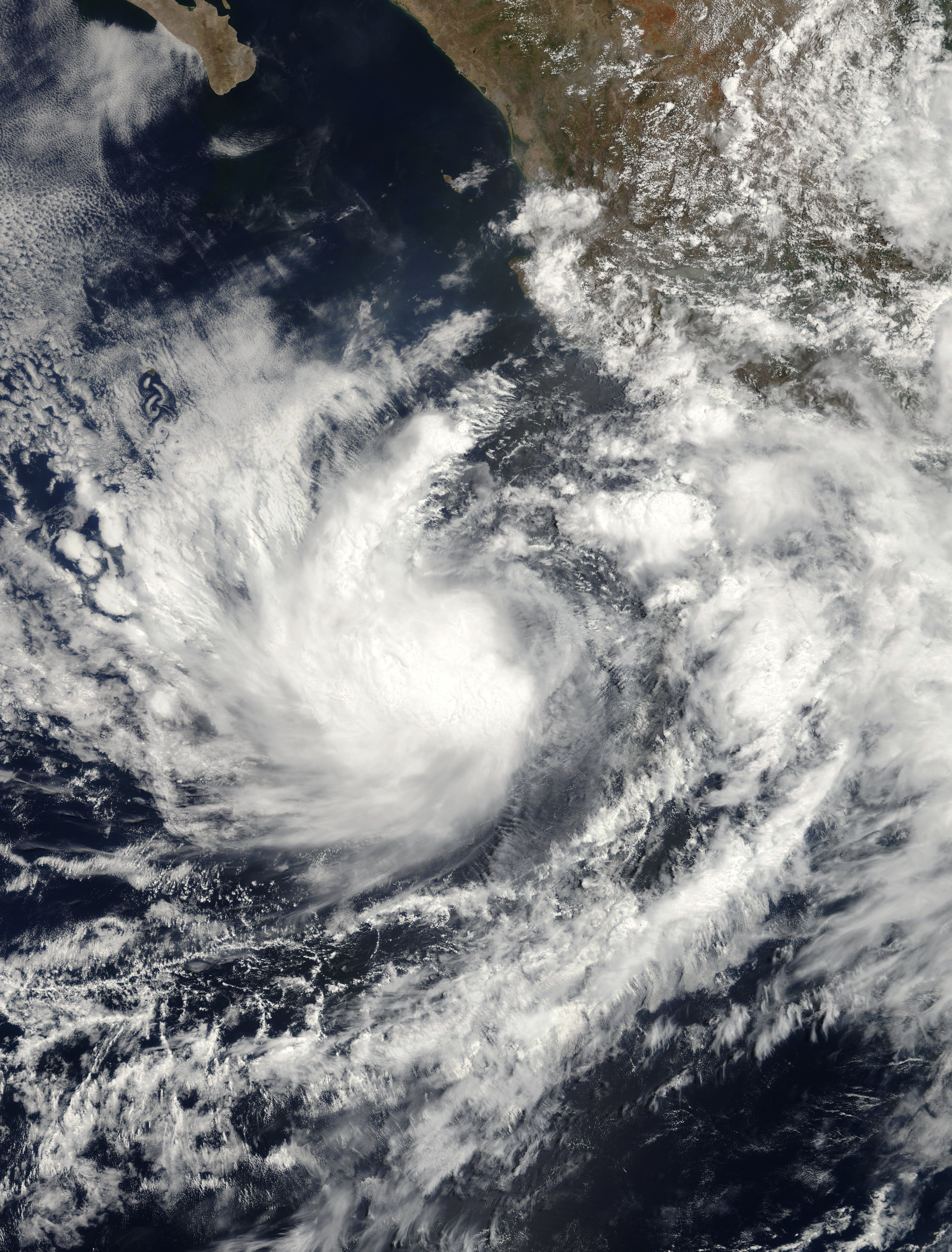
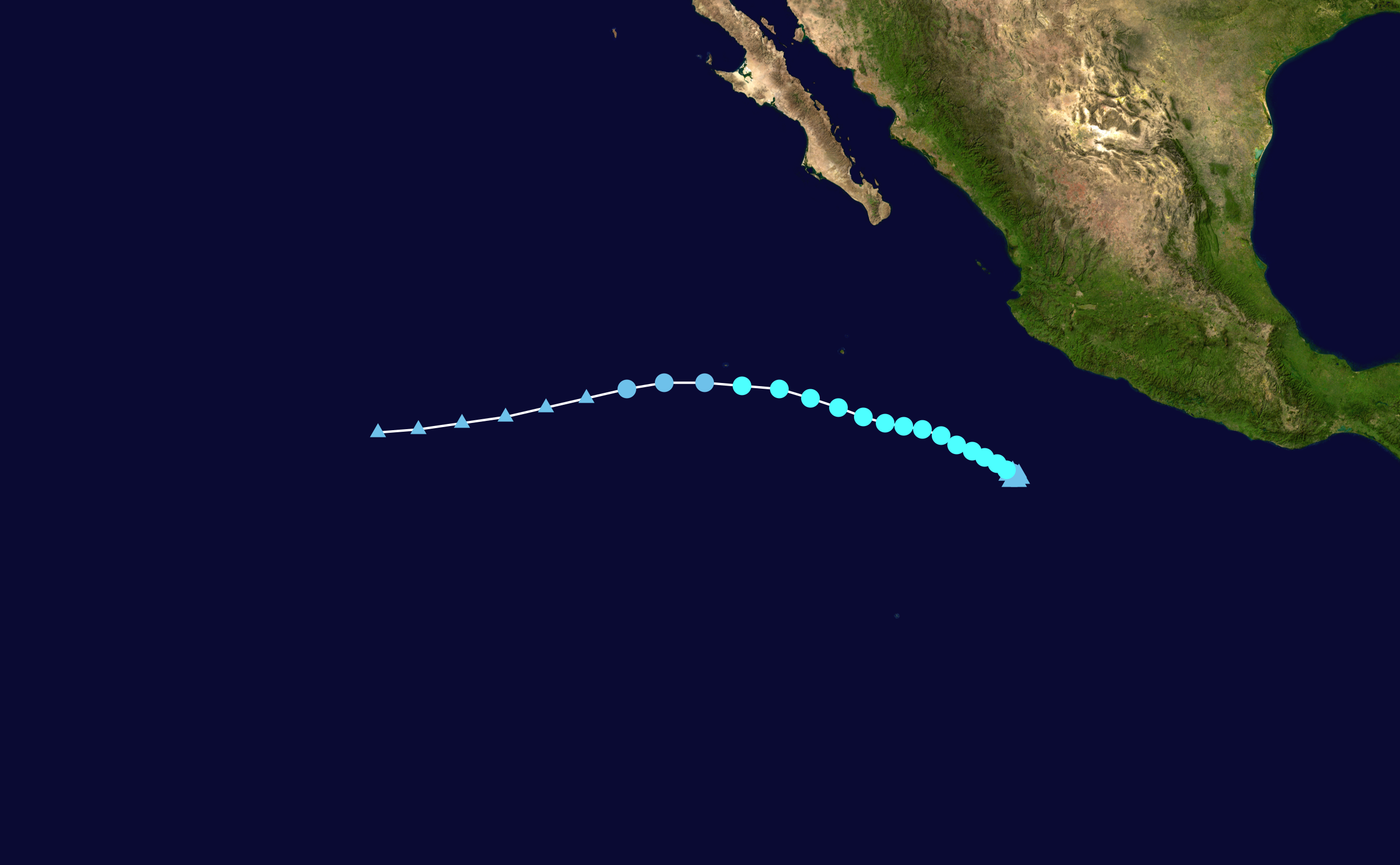
- Duration: June 17 – June 21
- Peak intensity: 65 mph (100 km/h) (1-min); 994 mbar (hPa)

On May 30, a new tropical wave moved off the west coast of Africa and entered the Atlantic Ocean. Little convective development took place as it traversed the region; however, as it crossed Central America between June 9 and 10, it began to show signs of strengthening. By June 13, an area of low pressure developed within the wave and slowly developed a surface circulation over the following 48 hours as it remained nearly stationary over open waters. Early on June 17, deep convection was able to maintain itself over the system, prompting the NHC to classify the low as Tropical Depression Three-E; at this time, the depression was situated 305 mi (490 km) south-southwest of Manzanillo, Mexico. Within hours of becoming a tropical depression, a ship in the region reported sustained winds of 45 mph (70 km/h), indicating that the system had developed into a tropical storm. The newly upgraded storm, now named Blas by the NHC, began to track slowly to the northwest, and later nearly due west, in response to a strengthening ridge over Mexico.

Strong wind shear prevented Blas from strengthening further over the following day; however, by June 19, the system entered a region of weaker shear. This allowed convection to develop over the center of circulation and that afternoon, the storm attained its peak intensity with winds of 65 mph (105 km/h) and a pressure of 992 mbar (hPa; 29.29 inHg). Shortly thereafter, cooler sea surface temperatures took their toll on Blas, causing the storm to gradually weaken. By June 21, the system weakened to a tropical depression as convection diminished. Hours later, it degenerated into a non-convective remnant low while situated about 715 mi (1,151 km) west-southwest of the southern tip of Baja California Sur. The remnants of Blas persisted through June 23 as they continued westward, before it dissipated to a weak upper-level low.

=== Hurricane Celia ===
- Category 5 hurricane (SSHWS)
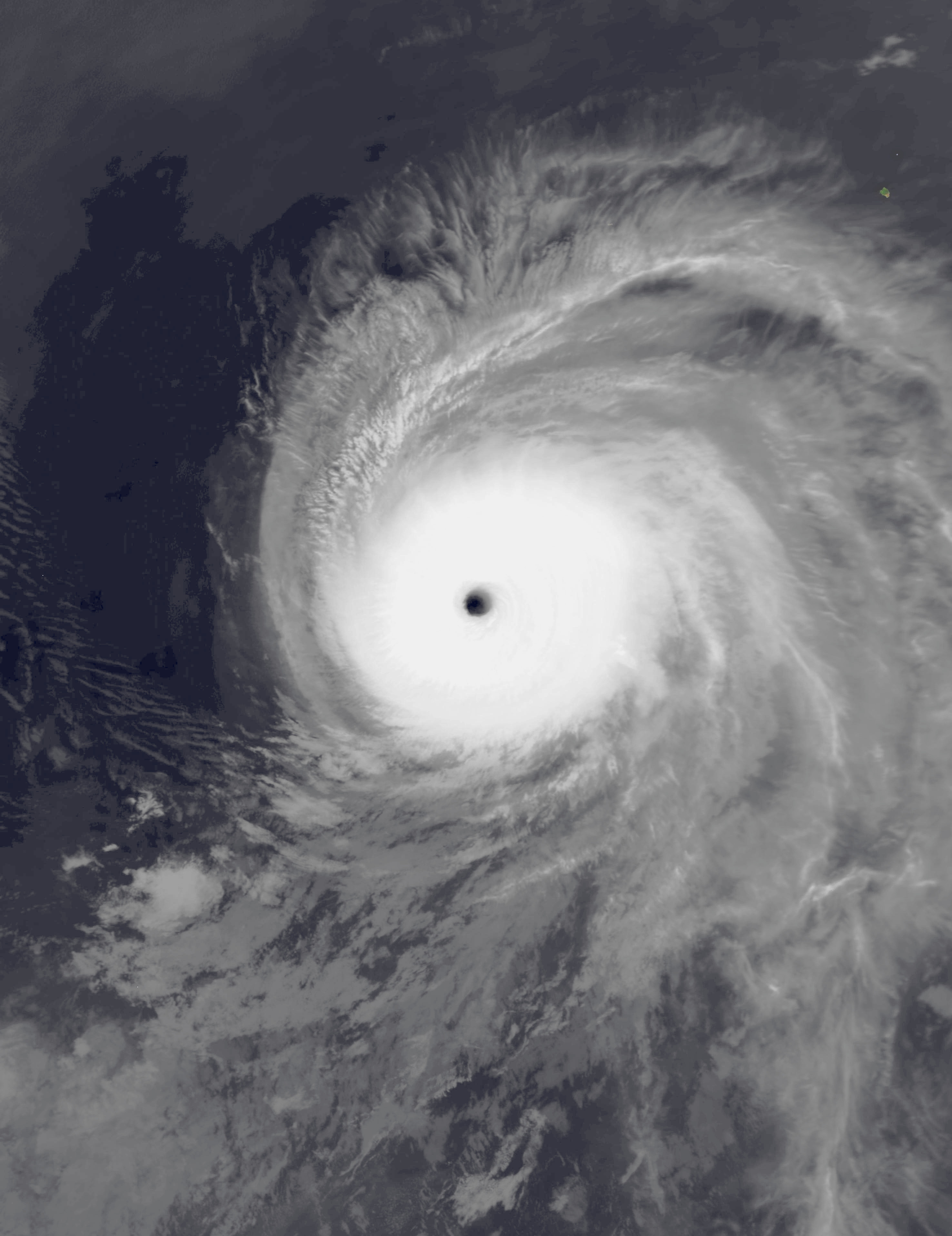
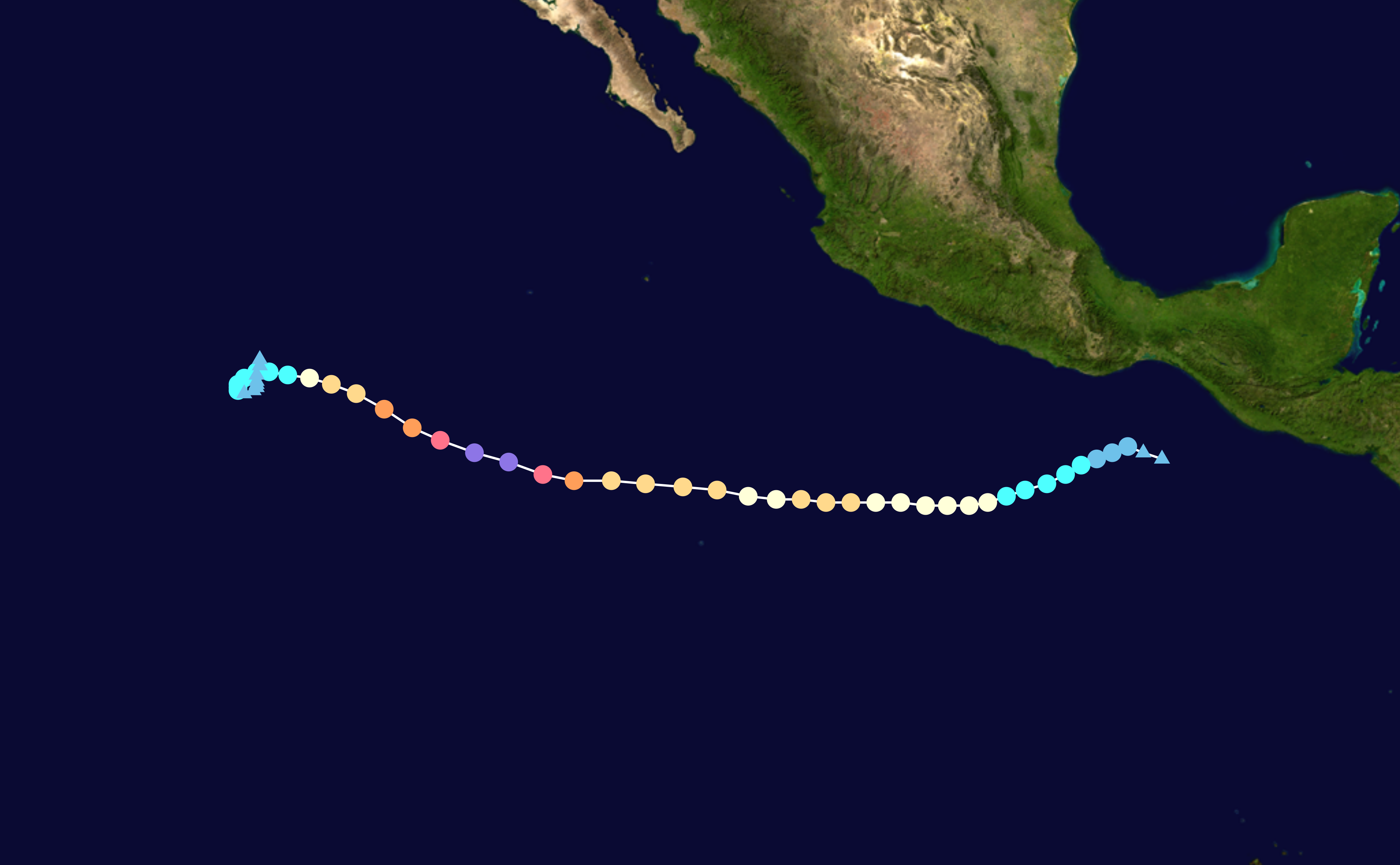
- Duration: June 18 – June 28
- Peak intensity: 160 mph (260 km/h) (1-min); 921 mbar (hPa)

On June 5, 2010, a tropical wave exited western Africa and traversed westward across the Atlantic Ocean. The system eventually crossed Central America and entered the Pacific Ocean on June 17. Thereafter, the thunderstorms increased along the wave axis as the system moved toward the west-northwest, steered by a ridge to the north. A low-pressure area formed on June 18, which continued to organize. Around 18:00 UTC that day, Tropical Depression Four-E developed about 370 mi (590 km) southeast of Acapulco, Mexico. The thunderstorms diminished before redeveloping and becoming better organized. Around 12:00 UTC on June 19, the National Hurricane Center (NHC) to upgrade the depression to Tropical Storm Celia. Around that time, the storm had an eye-like feature, consisting of a ring of convection around the circulation. which continued to organize within the central dense overcast. Celia moved generally to the west to west-southwest and continued to intensify despite northeasterly wind shear. At 18:00 UTC on June 20, Celia attained hurricane status, with maximum sustained winds of 75 mph (120 km/h).

Wind shear displaced the circulation and restricted outflow. On June 22, Celia strengthened to a Category 2 on the Saffir-Simpson scale. It weakened slightly the next day, and the eye became no longer visible on satellite imagery. The following morning, the eye reformed and the storm became more vertically aligned, allowing Celia to re-attain Category 2 status on June 23. The hurricane briefly weakened again as the eye dissipated. On June 24, the wind shear decreased, allowing Celia to restrengthen again as the eye reformed and became symmetrical. At 00:00 UTC on June 25, Celia attained maximum sustained winds of 160 mph (255 km/h) and a barometric pressure estimated at 921 mbar (hPa; 27.20 inHg). This made it a Category 5 on the Saffir-Simpson scale, the first Pacific hurricane of that intensity in June since Hurricane Ava in 1973. At its peak, Celia had a well-defined eye estimated to be 17 to 23 mi (27 to 37 km) in diameter. After maintaining peak winds for about 12 hours, Celia began weakening due to cooler waters and higher wind shear. On June 27, it fell to tropical storm status as the track slowed and shifted to the west-southwest, after the ridge weakened that was previously guiding Celia. The storm lost all convection on June 28, and degenerated into a remnant low. The remnants of Celia executed a small loop before drifting to the north and dissipating on June 30, located about 990 mi (1,590 km) southwest of the southern tip of Baja California Sur.

During Celia's early development stages, it brought rainfall to parts of Oaxaca and Guerrero. Beaches in both states increased the number of lifeguards on duty due to the threat of rip currents. The Sistema Nacional de Protección Civil (National System of Civil Protection) raised the alert level to stage two for coastal areas of Jalisco, Michoacán, and Colima. A precautionary alert was issued for Socorro Island. Between June 22 and 23, the outer bands of the storm brought unsettled weather to France's Clipperton Island.

=== Hurricane Darby ===
- Category 3 hurricane (SSHWS)
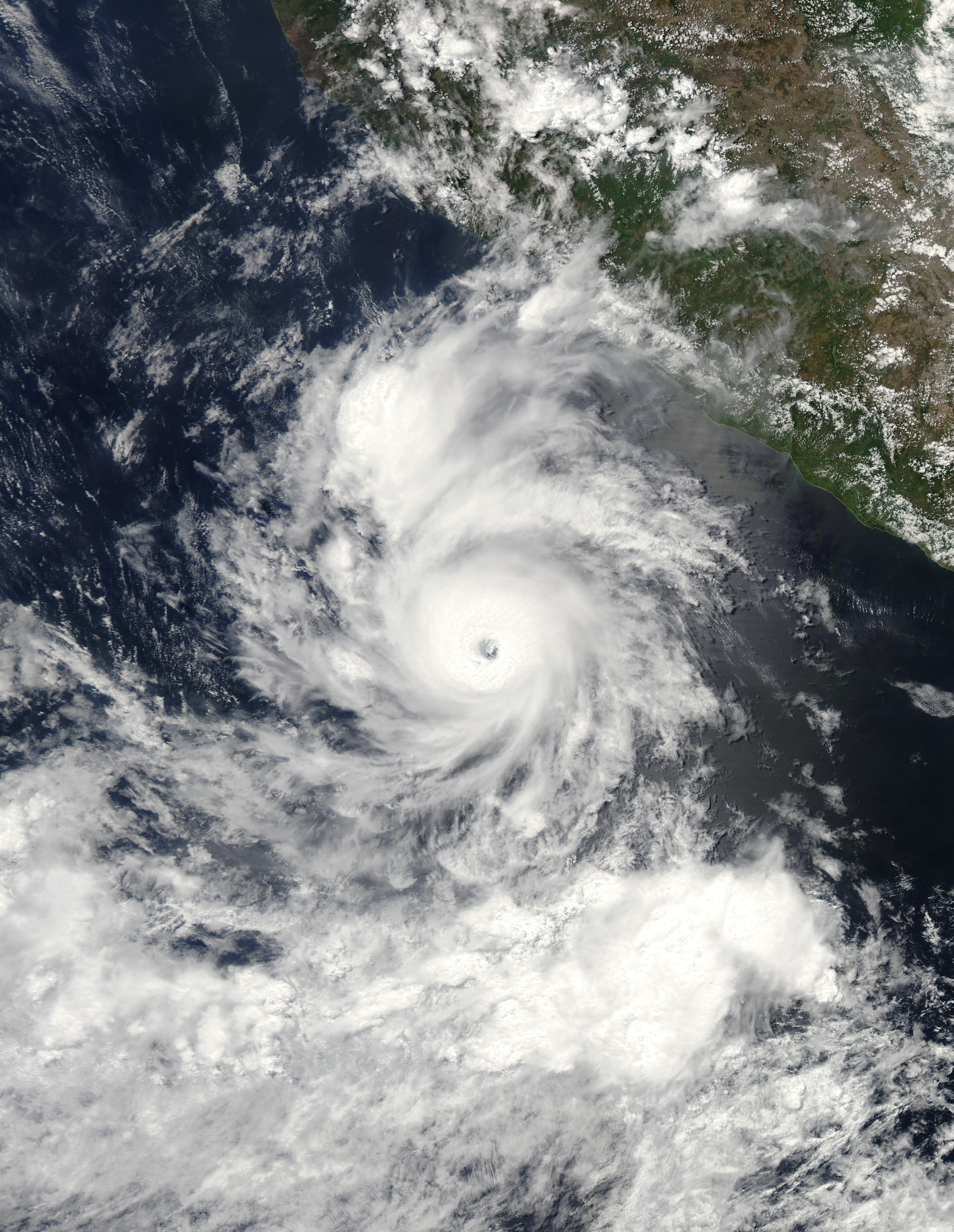
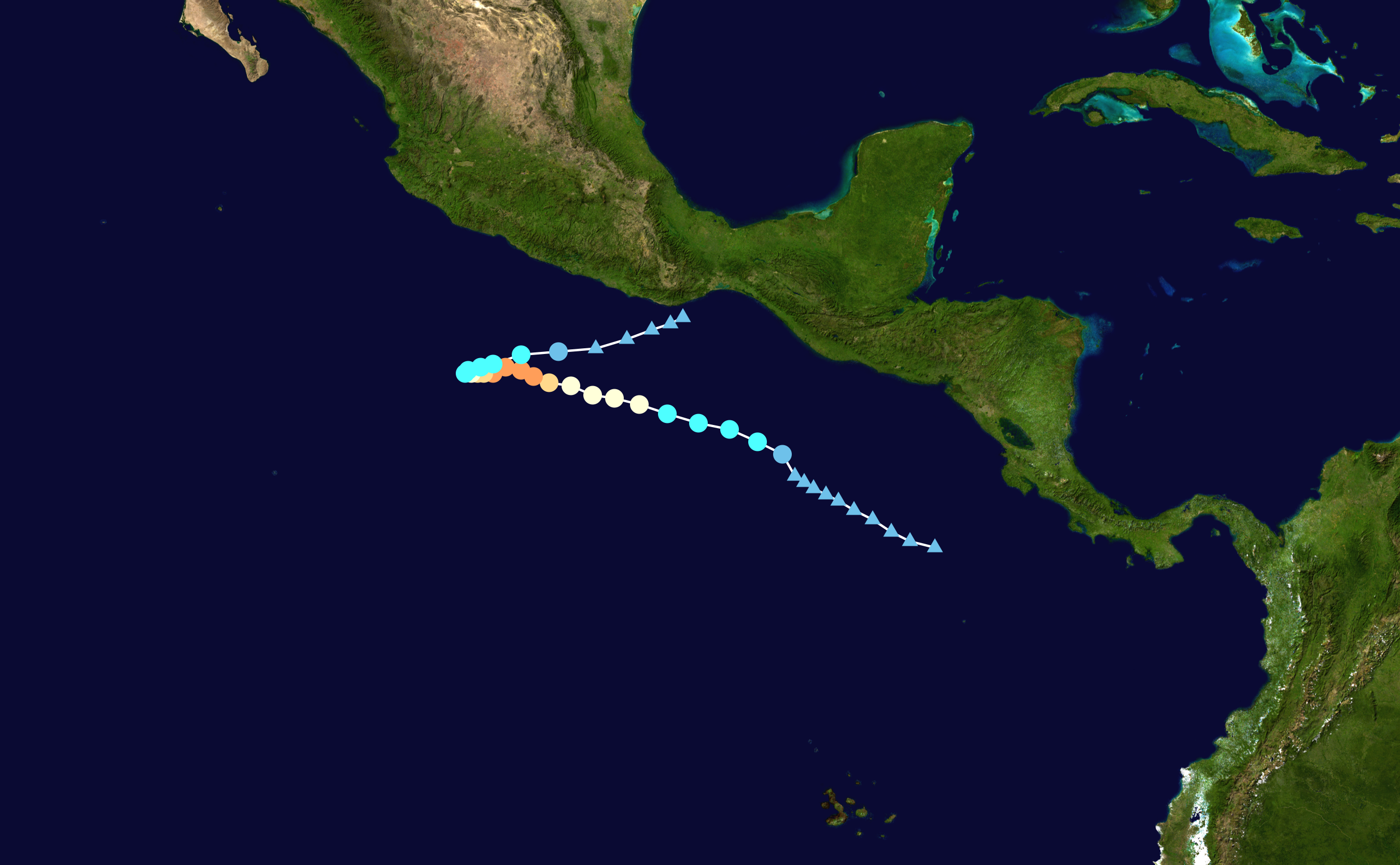
- Duration: June 23 – June 28
- Peak intensity: 120 mph (195 km/h) (1-min); 959 mbar (hPa)

The second, and final, major hurricane of the season, Hurricane Darby originated from a vigorous tropical wave that moved off the west coast of Africa on June 8. Initially well-organized, the wave rapidly deteriorated within 24 hours; it continued westward without redevelopment and entered the Eastern Pacific on June 19. The following day, an area of low pressure developed within the system as it slowed and turned towards the west-northwest. Gradually organizing, the low strengthened into a tropical depression on June 23 while situated roughly 380 mi (610 km) south-southeast of Salina Cruz, Mexico. Over the following two days, Darby underwent two periods of rapid intensification. At the end of the second phase on June 25, the storm attained its peak intensity as a Category 3 hurricane with winds of 120 mph (195 km/h) and a pressure of 959 mbar (hPa; 28.32 inHg). Though a strong storm, Darby was unusually small with tropical storm force winds extending only 70 mi (115 km) from its center.

Not long after peaking, a large area of westerly winds, produced by Hurricane Alex over the Gulf of Mexico, caused Darby to stall offshore before turning to the east, being drawn into the circulation of the larger storm. Increased wind shear produced by the "massive outflow of Alex" caused the small storm to rapidly weaken. By June 28, Darby had diminished to a tropical depression and later to a remnant low off the coast of Mexico. The low persisted for another day before fully dissipating offshore.

While offshore, authorities in Mexico advised residents to be cautious of heavy rains from Darby. Alerts were issued for several areas; however, the storm dissipated before reaching land. The combined effects of Hurricanes Alex and Darby resulted in heavy rains over much of Chiapas, amounting to 12 to 16 in (300 to 400 mm) in some areas. Flash flooding damaged 43 homes and affected 60,000 people.

=== Tropical Depression Six-E ===
- Tropical depression (SSHWS)
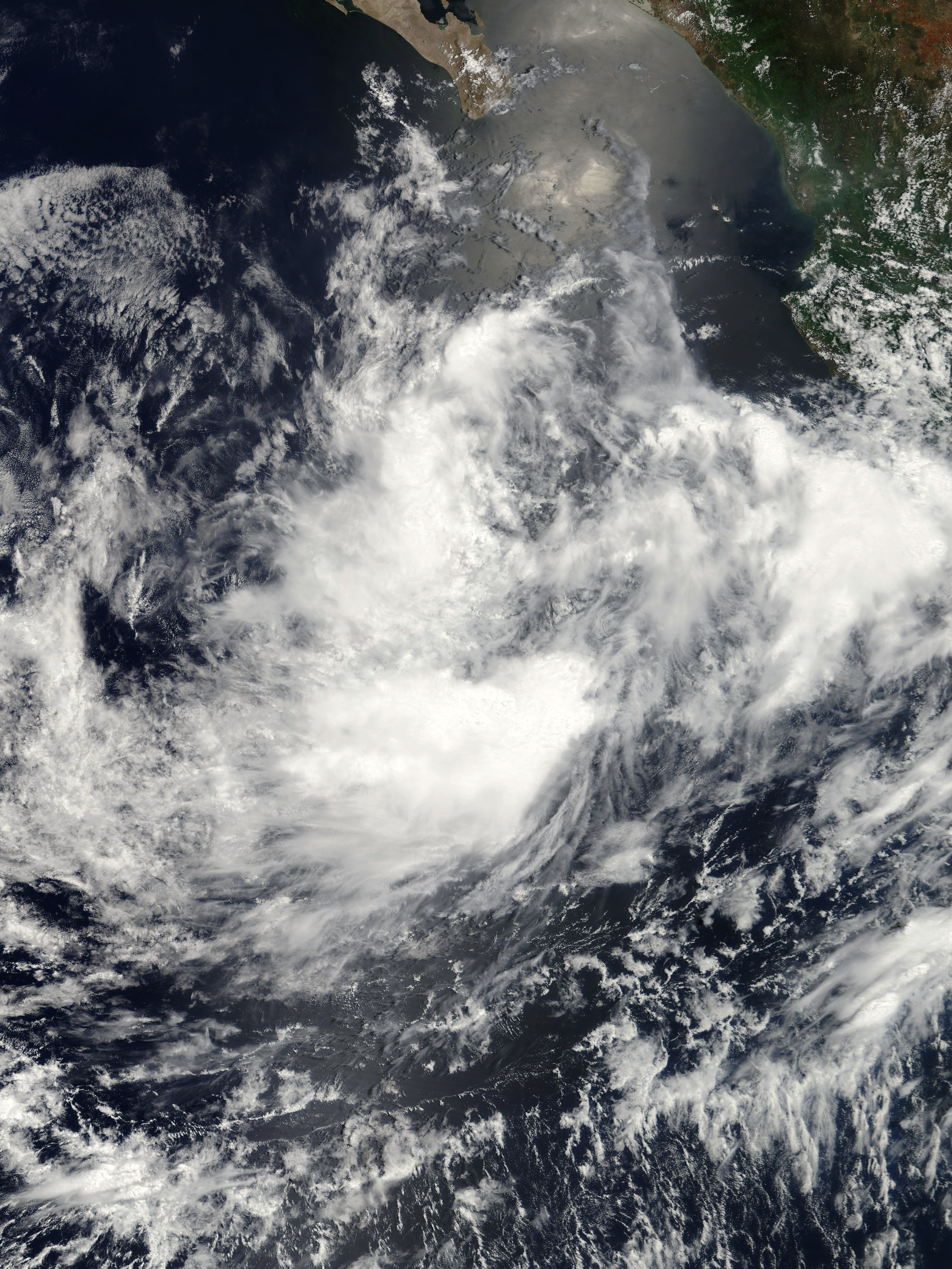
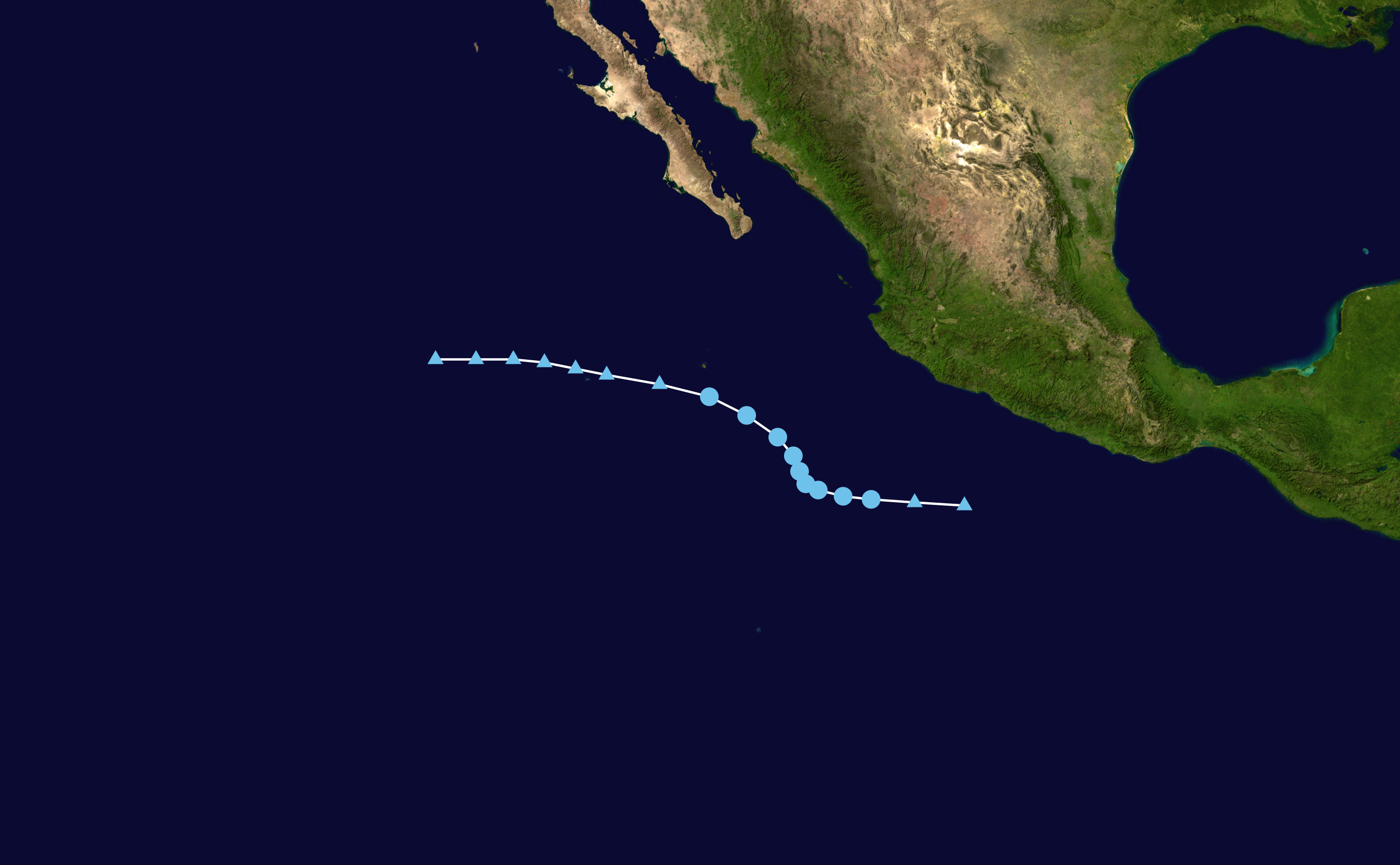
- Duration: July 14 – July 16
- Peak intensity: 35 mph (55 km/h) (1-min); 1006 mbar (hPa)

On July 11, a low pressure formed southwest of Central America. The next day, the system began to organize. After a decrease in convection, the system became more concentrated. After additional development, the NHC upgraded the disturbance into Tropical Depression Six-E on July 14. Six-E slowed down forward momentum, and slowly turned north. The depression did not develop further, and it degenerated into an area of low pressure on July 16. However, the remnant low of the system continued moving westward for the next couple days, before fully dissipating on July 18.

Though relatively far from land, the depression's outer bands brought locally heavy rains to portions of Colima and Jalisco.

=== Tropical Storm Estelle ===
- Tropical storm (SSHWS)
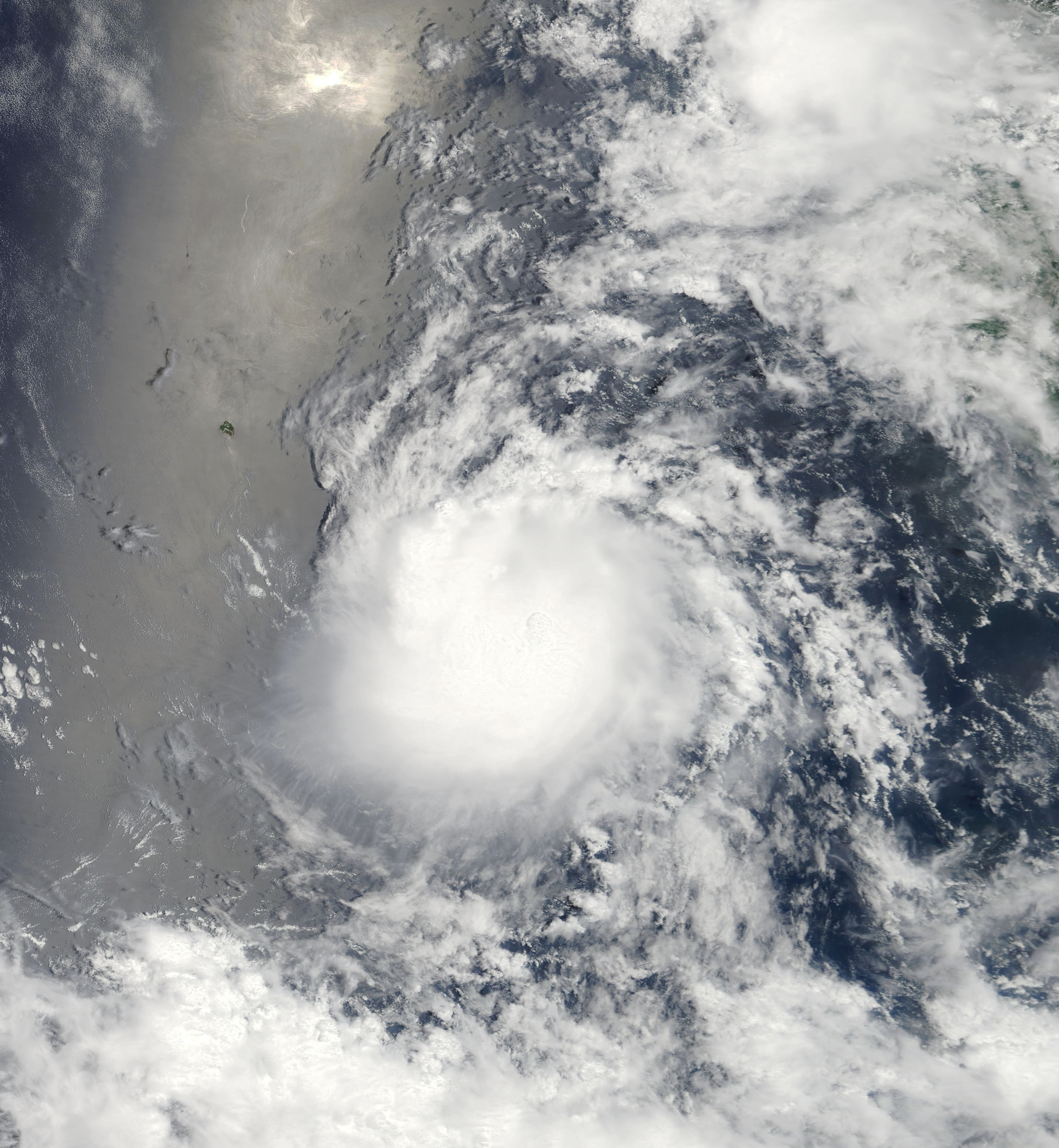
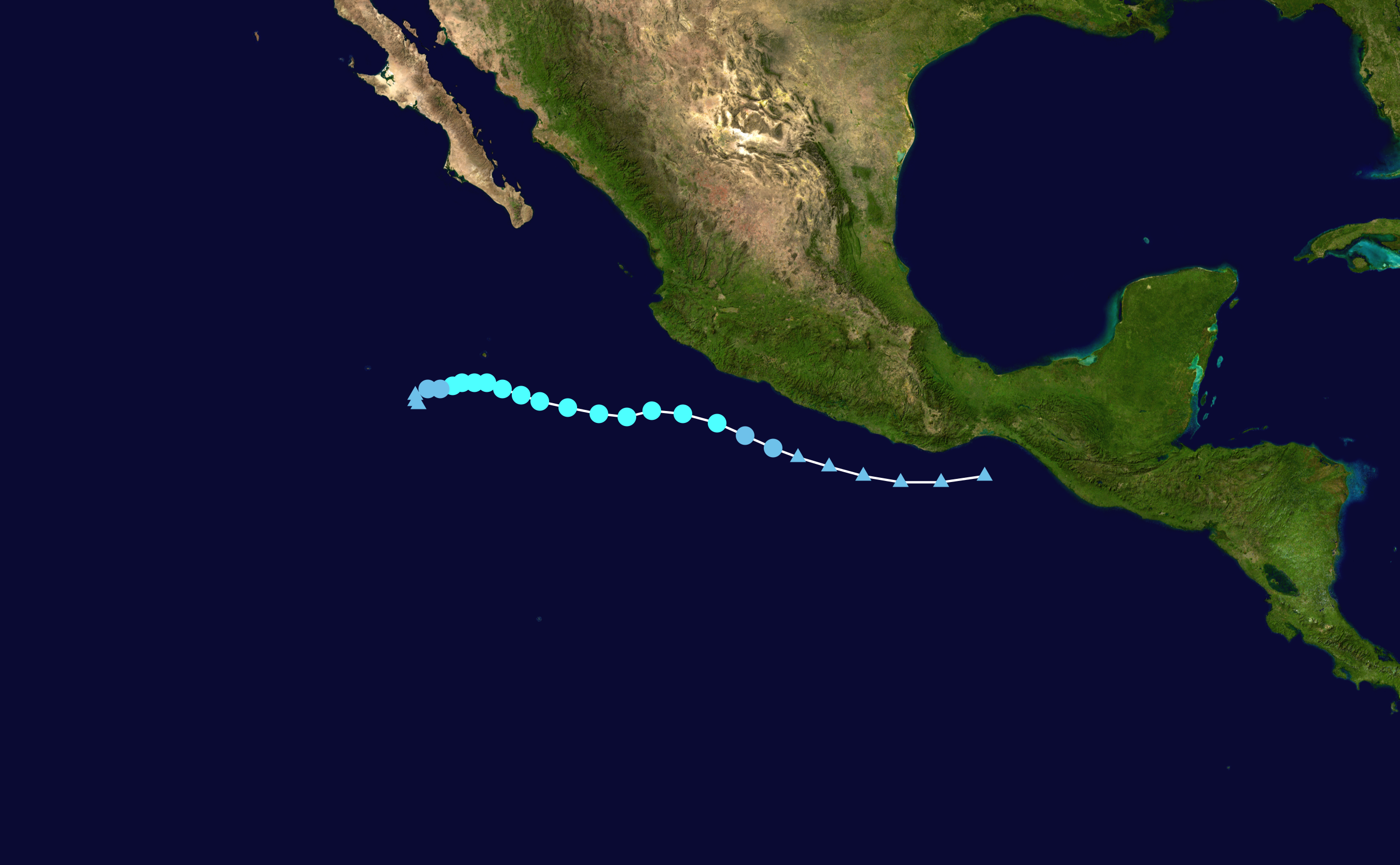
- Duration: August 6 – August 10
- Peak intensity: 65 mph (100 km/h) (1-min); 994 mbar (hPa)

After an unusual, record inactive July, an area of disturbed weather formed off the south coast of Mexico, on August 4 from a tropical wave that left Africa 13 days earlier. The system became better organized throughout the next day, and was upgraded into a tropical depression on August 6, 138 mi (222 km) southwest of Acapulco, Mexico. Initially, there was uncertainty regarding the storm's path. It reached tropical storm status on the same day. On August 8, the storm showed signs of weakening. It was downgraded into a tropical depression the next day. Estelle became a remnant low on August 10, dissipating shortly thereafter.

Though the center of Estelle remained offshore, its outer bands brought moderate to heavy rains and increased surf to coastal areas of Guerrero, Michoacán, Colima, and Jalisco on August 7. The following day, a detachment of clouds associated with the storm brought locally heavy rains to Mazatlán, resulting in localized street flooding.

=== Tropical Depression Eight-E ===
- Tropical depression (SSHWS)
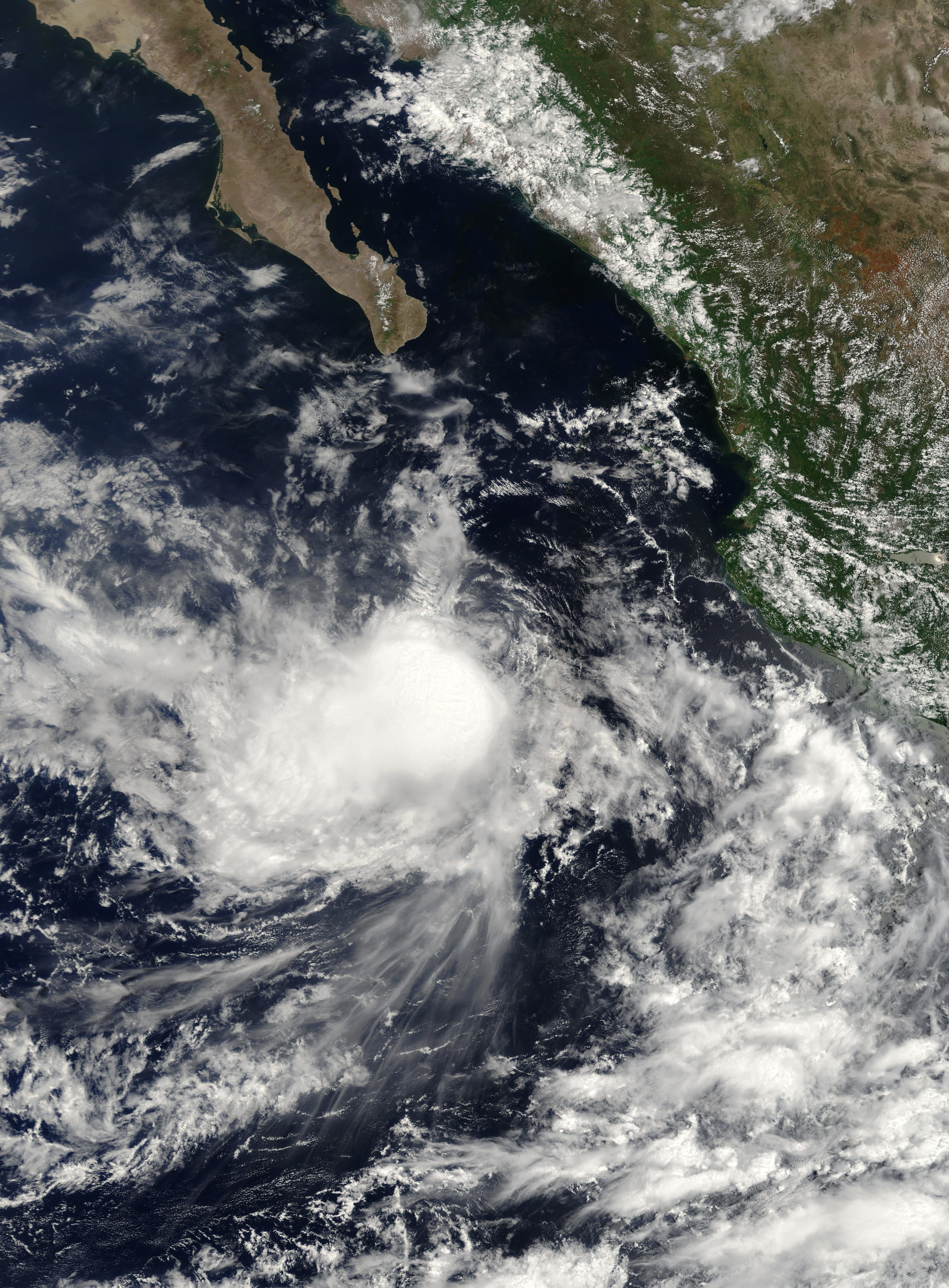
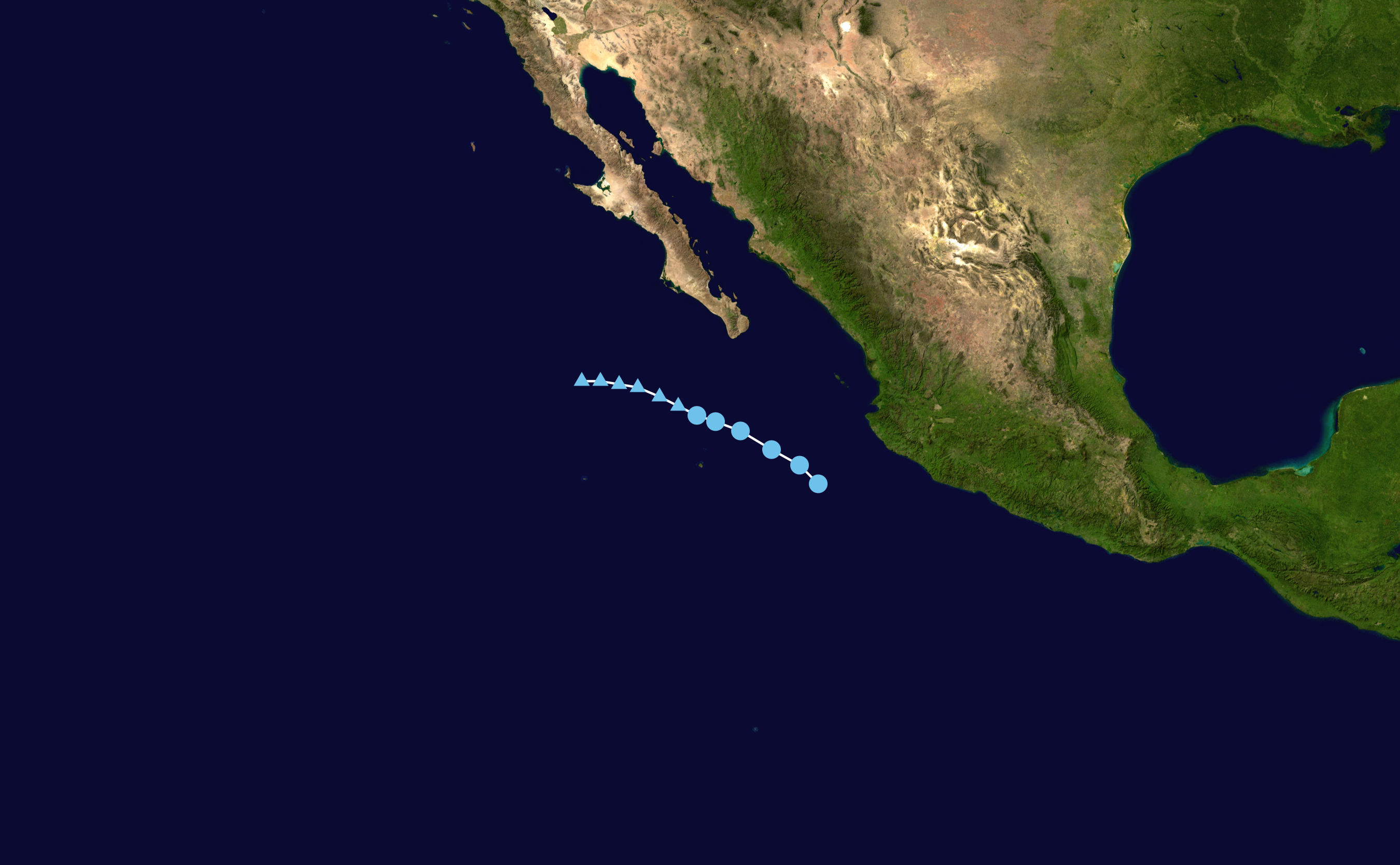
- Duration: August 20 – August 21
- Peak intensity: 35 mph (55 km/h) (1-min); 1003 mbar (hPa)

On August 3, a tropical wave moved off the west coast of Africa and tracked westward across the Atlantic Ocean. By August 15, the wave crossed Central America and entered the Eastern Pacific. Over the following five days, development was relatively slow at first, resulting in forecasters at the NHC not predicting the system to become a tropical cyclone. However, on August 20, a low-pressure area formed and quickly became a tropical depression. At this time, the system was situated roughly 185 mi (300 km) west-southwest of Manzanillo, Mexico. Tracking northwestward in response to a mid-level ridge over northwestern Mexico, the depression moved through a region of moderate wind shear, preventing further development. Once over cooler waters on August 21, convection began to wane and the system degenerated into a remnant low later that day. Continuing along the same path, the remnants of the depression dissipated early on August 23, over open waters.

=== Hurricane Frank ===
- Category 1 hurricane (SSHWS)
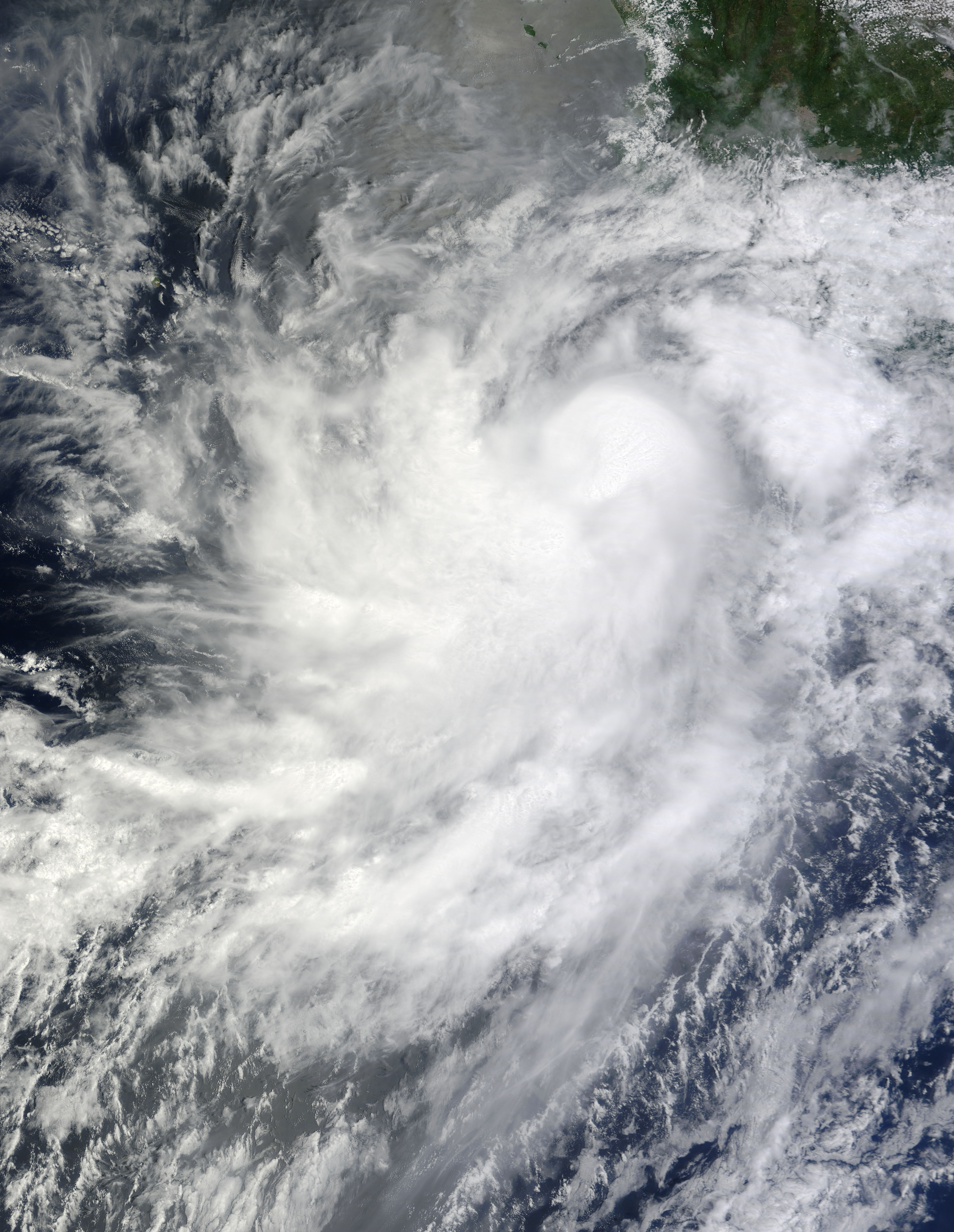
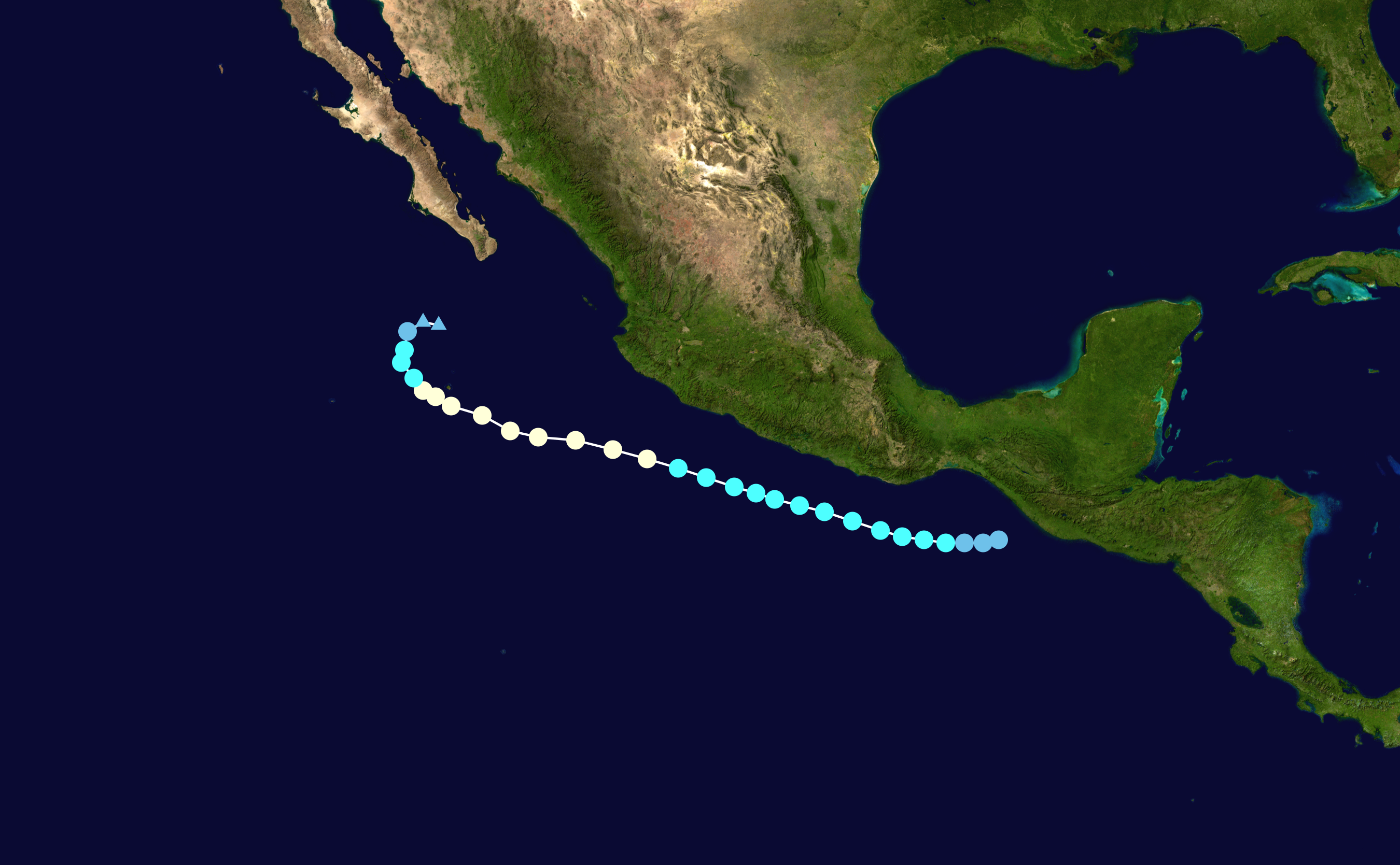
- Duration: August 21 – August 28
- Peak intensity: 90 mph (150 km/h) (1-min); 978 mbar (hPa)

The tropical wave that became Frank was first noticed on August 15 south of the Windward Islands. Tropical Depression Nine-E formed on August 21 south of the Gulf of Tehuantepec. It developed into a tropical storm the following morning. On August 23, Frank continued to intensify, but later faced shear and entered a period of weakening. However, on August 24, as shear decreased, it began to reorganize and strengthen again, becoming a hurricane on August 25. Frank also formed an eye feature that persisted for about a day. Two days later, Frank weakened back into a tropical storm. Frank encountered unfavorable conditions of high shear and cool waters, causing it to rapidly weakening overnight. Frank became a remnant low on August 28.

In Mexico, six deaths were reported. A total 30 homes were destroyed with 26 others damaged. Two major roads were damaged with another road blocked due to a landslides. Several rivers overflowed their banks as well. In the wake of the storm, 110 communities requested assistance from the government. By September 14, an estimated 200,000 food packages were distributed to the region. Losses from Hurricane Frank exceeded 100 million pesos (US$8.3 million).

=== Tropical Depression Ten-E ===
- Tropical depression (SSHWS)
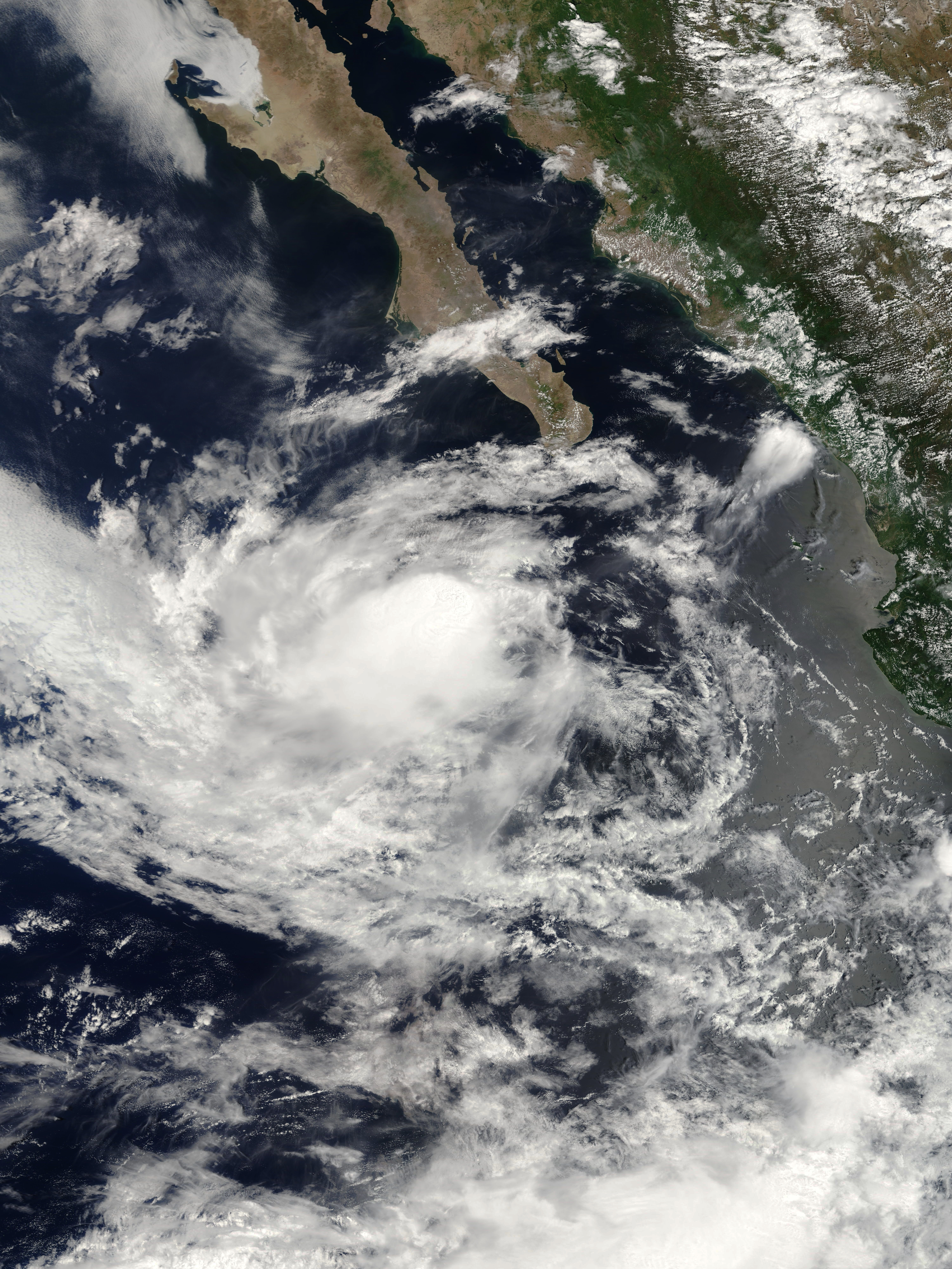
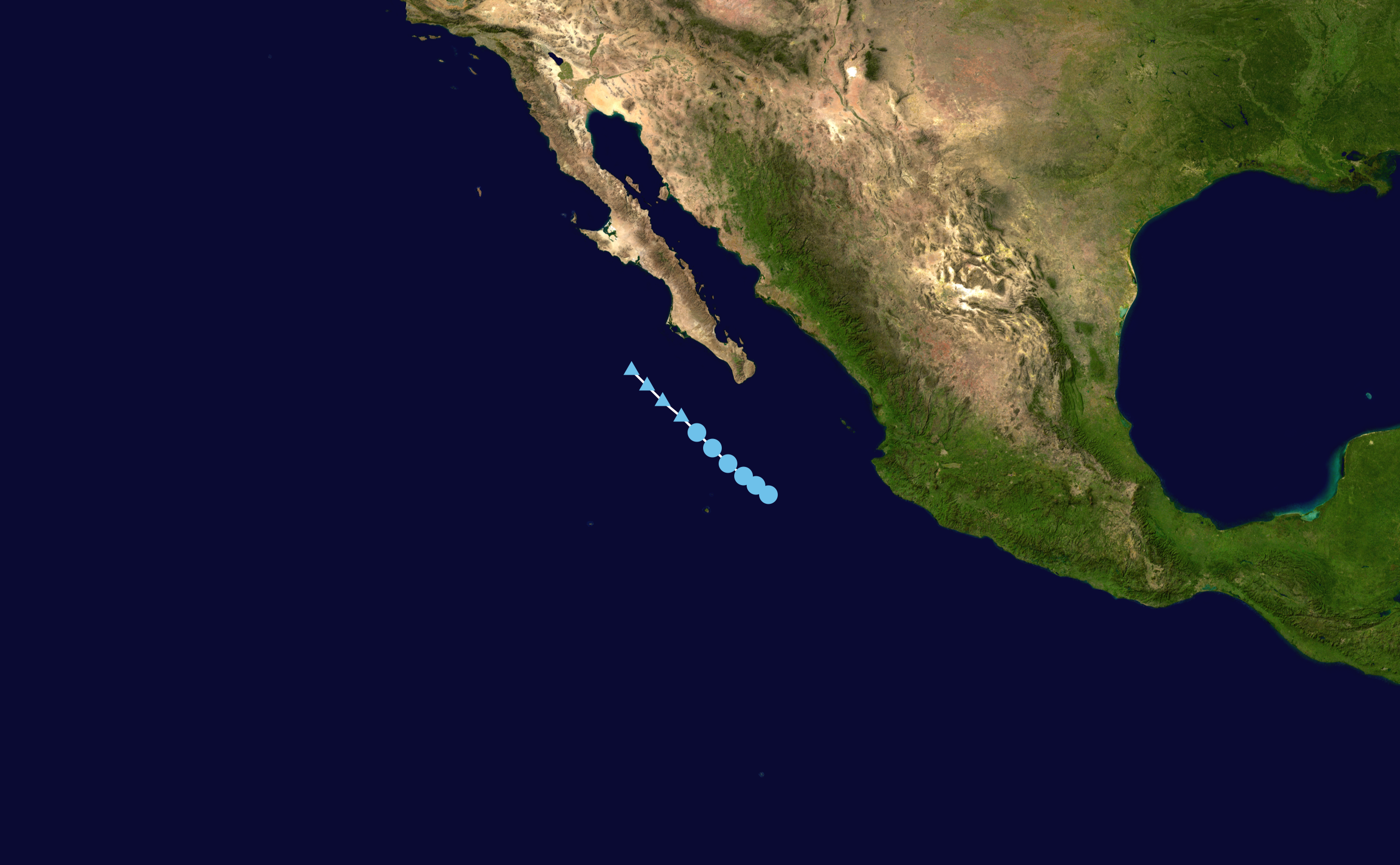
- Duration: September 3 – September 4
- Peak intensity: 35 mph (55 km/h) (1-min); 1003 mbar (hPa)

Tropical Depression Ten-E originated from a tropical wave that moved off the west coast of Africa on August 14. Tracking westward, the wave eventually crossed Central America and entered the Pacific Ocean on August 26. Gradual organization took place by early September as deepening convection. During September 3, a low-level circulation developed within the system and the NHC classified it as a tropical depression. At this time, the depression was situated roughly 255 mi (410 km) south-southeast of the southern tip of Baja California Sur. Located between a strong ridge over Mexico and trough over the north Pacific Ocean, the system tracked northwestward throughout the remainder of its existence. Maximum sustained winds never exceeded 35 mph (55 km/h) before moving into a region cooler waters and moderate wind shear. The combination of these two factors caused convection to diminish; the depression degenerated into a non-convective remnant low on September 4 before dissipating the following day.

=== Tropical Depression Eleven-E ===
- Tropical depression (SSHWS)
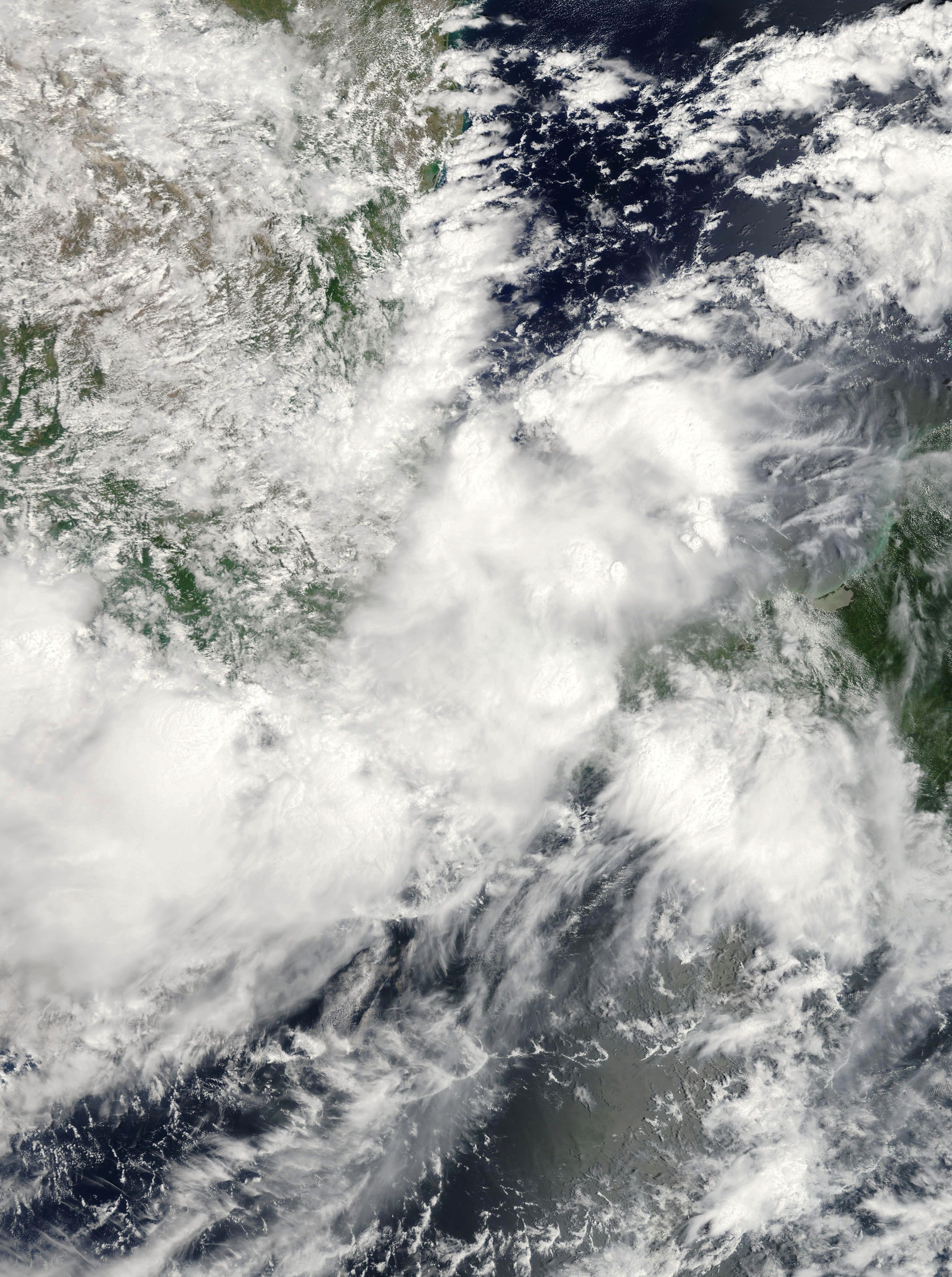
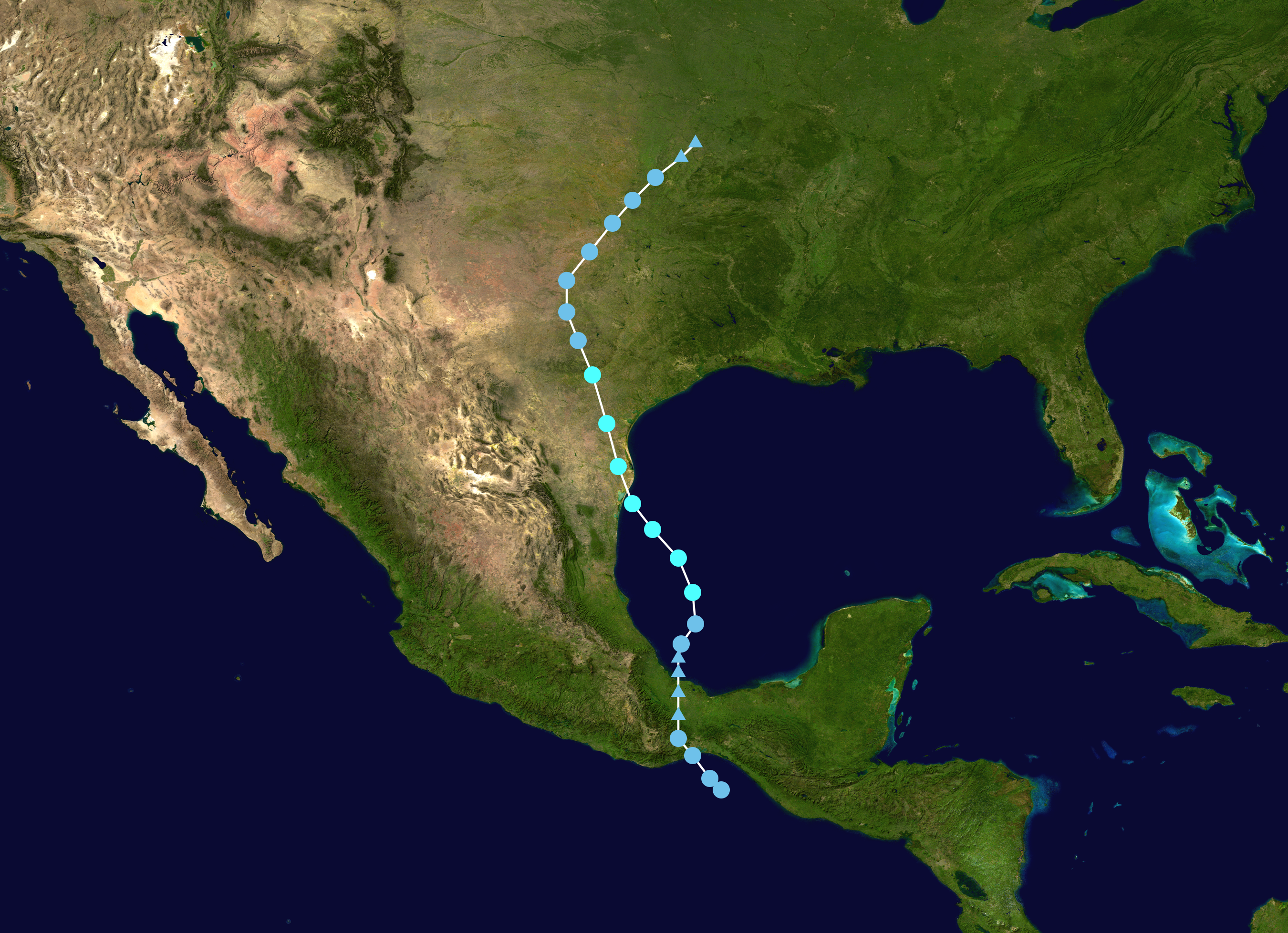
- Duration: September 3 – September 4
- Peak intensity: 35 mph (55 km/h) (1-min); 1004 mbar (hPa)

During mid-August, a westward moving tropical wave in the Atlantic Ocean spawned Hurricane Danielle. The southern portion of this system continued its track and later entered the Eastern Pacific on August 29. By September 2, convection consolidated over the Gulf of Tehuantepec and a low-level circulation developed as it moved in a general northward direction. Classified a tropical depression the following day, the National Hurricane Center initially expected it to attain tropical storm status before moving over land. A ship in the region measured gale-force winds, supporting this forecast but later analysis revealed that these winds were associated with a broad monsoon trough which the depression was embedded within. Failing to intensify, the system made landfall near Salina Cruz, Mexico and rapidly weakened. Maintaining its circulation, the depression survived its crossing of Mexico and regenerated into Atlantic Tropical Storm Hermine. The crossover of this storm is regarded as an uncommon occurrence, taking place only a handful of times since reliable records in the Atlantic began in 1851.

Due to the depression's proximity to land, tropical storm warnings were issued for southern Mexico. The depression produced a swath of heavy rain along its immediate track, with localized peaks over 10 in (250 mm) and a storm maximum of 13.6 in (350 mm) in Alvarado, Veracruz. Flooding affected more than 25,000 people in Oaxaca and 6,000 people in Guerrero. The monsoon trough in which the depression was embedded was responsible for tremendous damage across Central America, including at least 54 fatalities and $500 million in damage across Guatemala. At least three others perished in Costa Rica.

=== Tropical Storm Georgette ===
- Tropical storm (SSHWS)
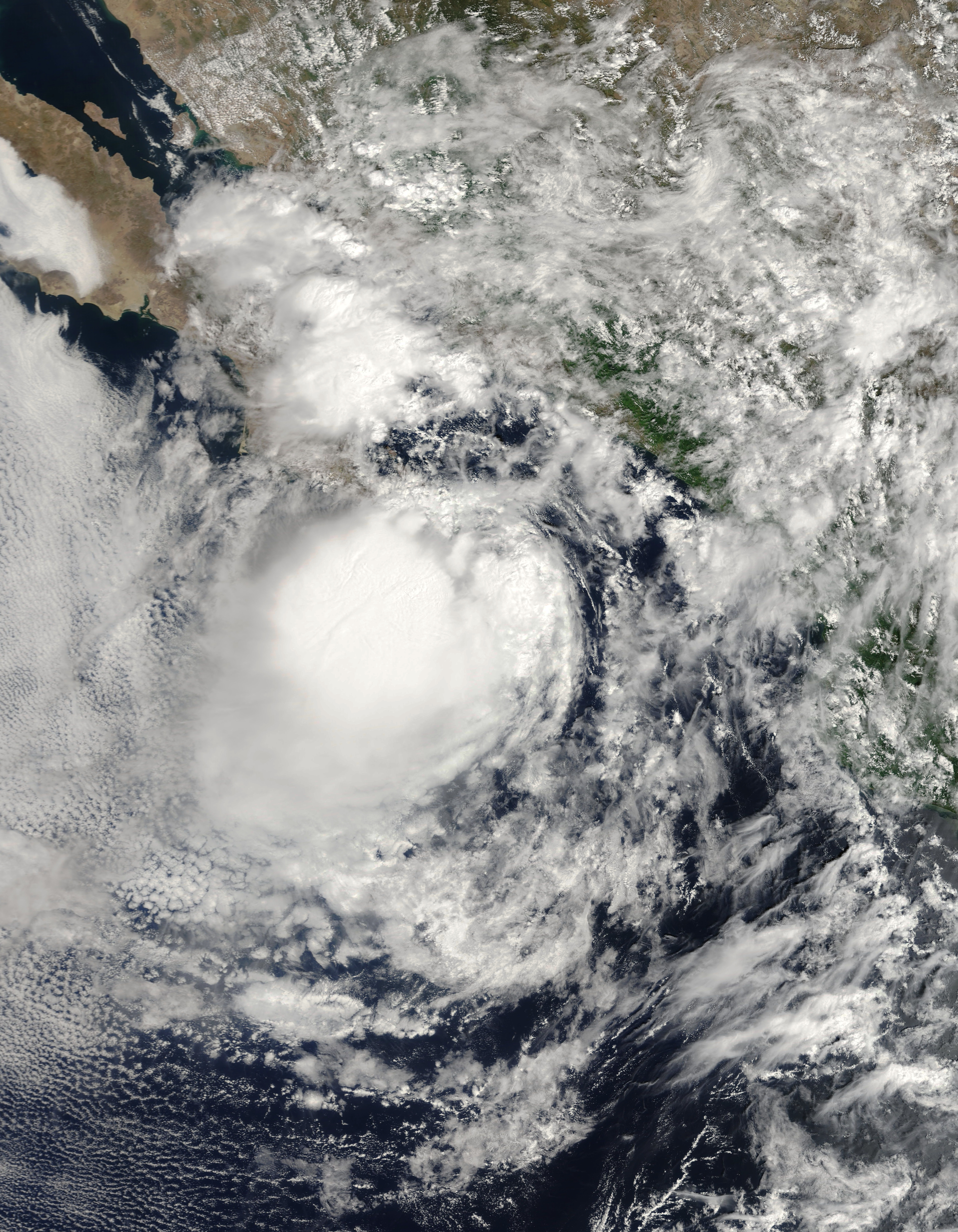
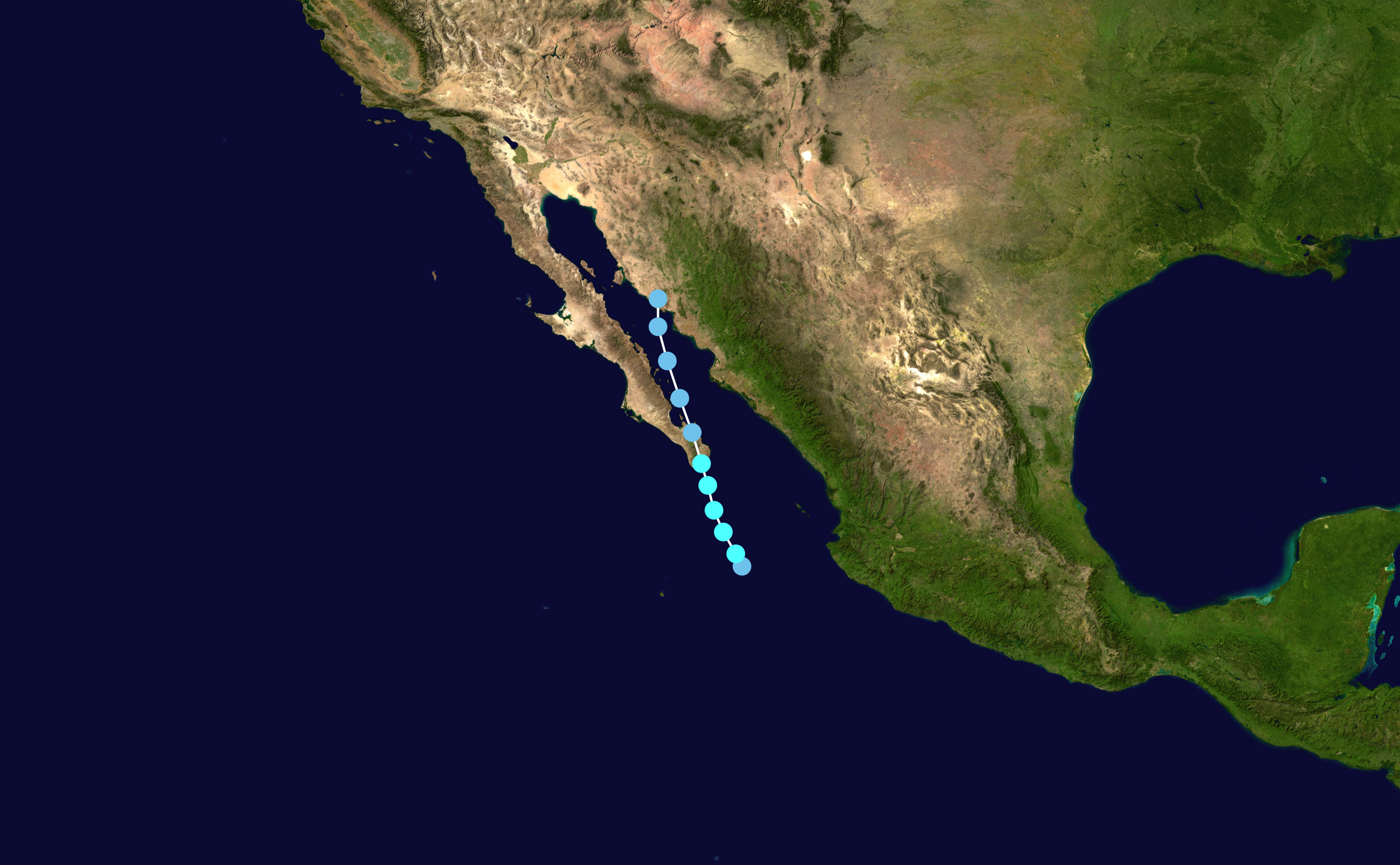
- Duration: September 20 – September 23
- Peak intensity: 40 mph (65 km/h) (1-min); 999 mbar (hPa)

Georgette originated from a tropical wave that moved off the west coast of Africa on September 1. Tracking westward across the Atlantic, the wave eventually spawned an area of low pressure, which developed into Hurricane Karl on September 14. The wave itself continued through the Caribbean Sea, and entered the Eastern Pacific on September 17, but signification development was not anticipated. Tracking northwestward, the low gradually organized into a tropical depression by September 20, at which time it was situated south of Baja California Sur. Shortly thereafter, it intensified into a tropical storm and was named Georgette. On September 21, Georgette attained its peak intensity with winds of 40 mph (65 km/h) and a minimum pressure of 999 mbar (hPa; 29.50 inHg). The storm struck Baja California Sur later that day before weakening to a tropical depression. It continued north as a depression and made landfall on mainland Mexico on September 22. The system dissipated over northern Mexico early on September 23.

Georgette caused the heaviest rains on Baja California Sur in the last 15 years, leaving many people homeless. Georgette also produced high waves. The tropical cyclone worsened Mexico's flooding problem which started when Hurricane Karl made landfall several days earlier. A peak rainfall total of 5.9 in (150 mm) fell in Todos Santos. Throughout Sonora, rainfall up to 4.7 in (120 mm) triggered flooding that damaged 220 homes. Georgette caused 2.61 in (66 mm) of rainfall in Guaymas Flooding was reported in several places (Empalme, Etchojoa, Navojoa, Guaymas, Los Mochis), causing 500,000 people to be evacuated. Heavy runoff caused inflows of 18,000 cu ft/s (510 m^{3}/s) into El Novillo Dam, forcing the Comisión Nacional del Agua, the local water authorities, to release water from the dam. After impacting Mexico, moisture from the system combined with an approaching trough to produce heavy rainfall and thunderstorms across New Mexico. A total of 6.42 in (163 mm) was reported in Gladstone. The rains caused flooding that killed a person along the Rio Grande near Carnuel. Damage in the US totaled to US$72,000.

=== Tropical Storm Omeka ===
- Tropical storm (SSHWS)
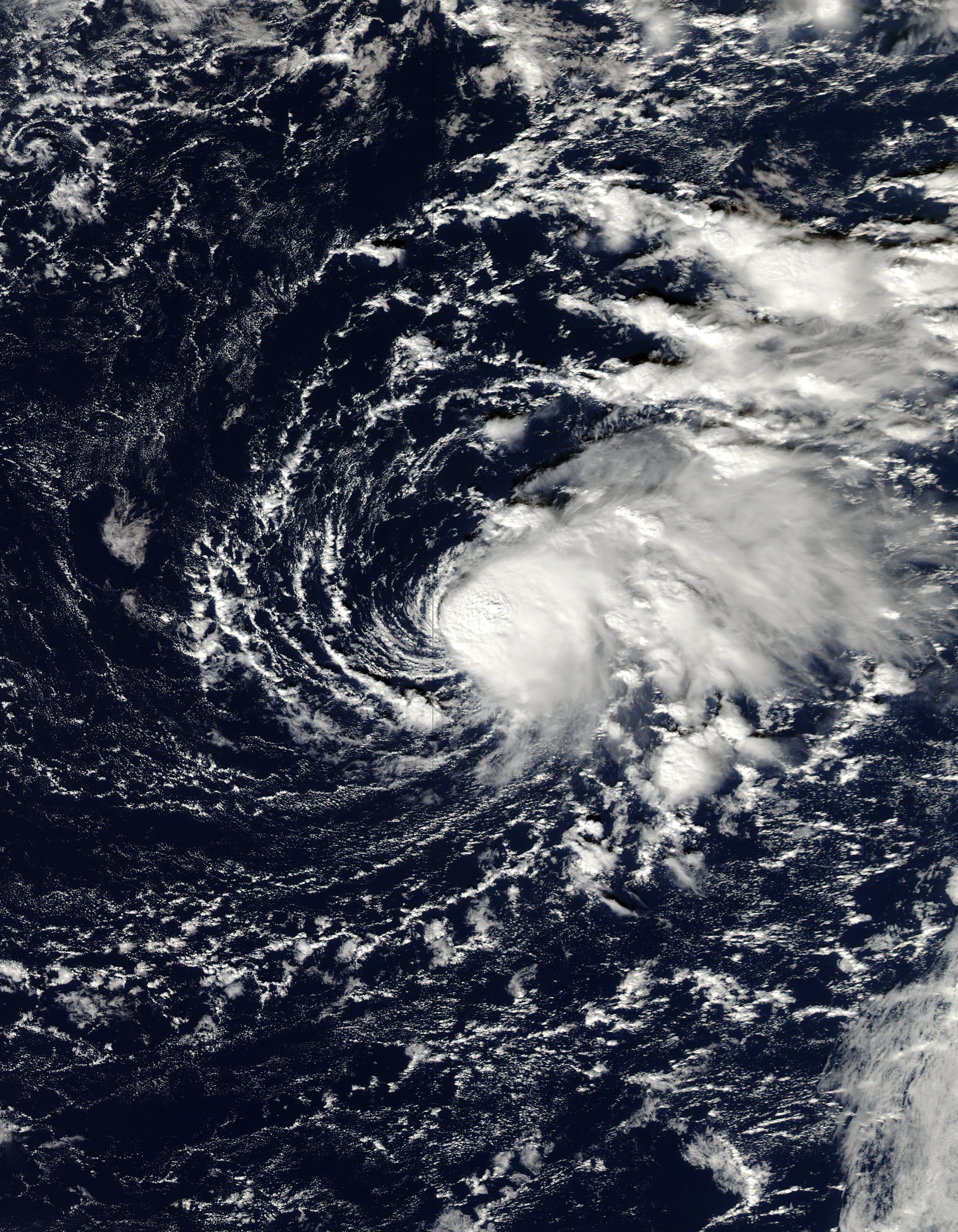
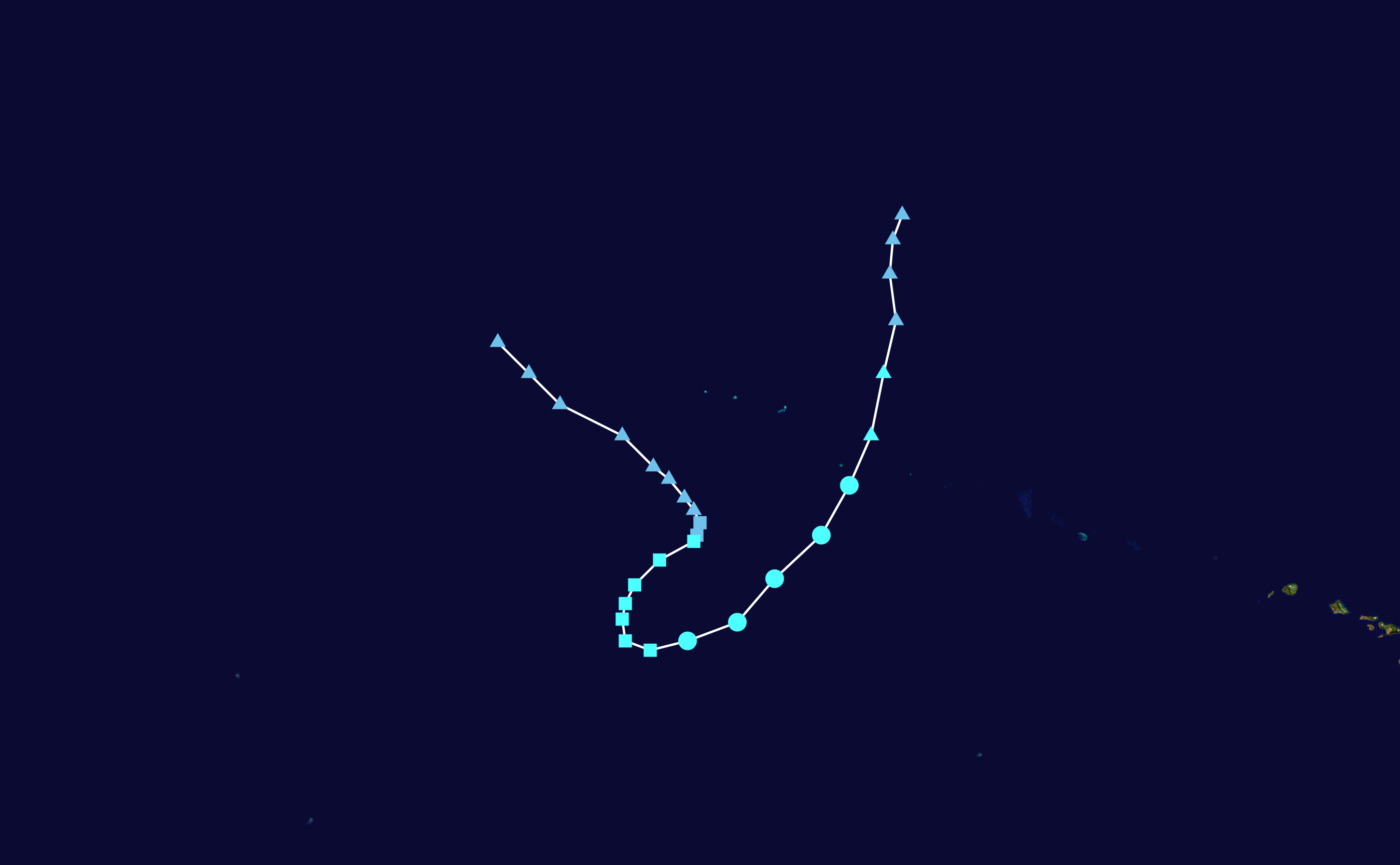
- Duration: December 18 – December 21 (Out of basin December 19–20)
- Peak intensity: 50 mph (85 km/h) (1-min); 997 mbar (hPa)

On December 16, an extratropical cyclone developed in the western Pacific Ocean beneath an upper-level low, just west of the International Date Line. The system drifted southeastward, crossing into the Central Pacific on December 17. Because the cyclone was large and sprawling, the CPHC did not anticipate development. On December 18, the system organized into a subtropical depression. It quickly intensified into a subtropical storm as it curved to the southeast into an area of warmer than normal water temperatures, which fueled the development of thunderstorms. On December 19, the storm crossed the International Date Line back into the western Pacific, and soon after developed a temporary eye-feature. The CPHC estimated peak winds of 60 mph (97 km/h) while in the Western Pacific. The storm soon turned eastward, crossing back into the Central Pacific on December 20 roughly 505 miles (813 km) south of Midway Island. At that time, the CPHC designated the system as Tropical Storm Omeka. The storm marked the latest date for a named storm in the basin since reliable records in the 1960s, as well as the first December named storm since Paka in 1997.

Upon entering the basin, Omeka had sustained winds of 50 mph (80 km/h), which marked its peak intensity in the basin. The storm was already weakening due to wind shear from an approaching trough, and it soon turned northeastward into an area of cooler waters. After intermittent bursts of convection, Omeka transitioned into an extratropical low on December 21. Around that time, the storm brushed Lisianski Island, part of the Papahānaumokuākea Marine National Monument. The low that was formerly Omeka dissipated on December 22.

== Storm names ==
The following list of names was used for named storms that formed in the North Pacific Ocean east of 140°W in 2010. This is the same list used for the 2004 season. as no names were retired after that season.

- Agatha
- Blas
- Celia
- Darby
- Estelle
- Frank
- Georgette
- Howard (unused)
- Isis (unused)
- Javier (unused)
- Kay (unused)
- Lester (unused)
- Madeline (unused)
- Newton (unused)
- Orlene (unused)
- Paine (unused)
- Roslyn (unused)
- Seymour (unused)
- Tina (unused)
- Virgil (unused)
- Winifred (unused)
- Xavier (unused)
- Yolanda (unused)
- Zeke (unused)

For storms that form in the North Pacific between 140°W to the International Date Line, the names come from a series of four rotating lists. Names are used one after the other without regard to year, and when the bottom of one list is reached, the next named storm receives the name at the top of the next list. One named storm, listed below, formed within the area in 2010.

- Omeka

=== Retirement ===
Even though the name was not used during this season, the World Meteorological Organization retired the name Isis from the rotating Eastern Pacific name lists in 2015 after the name has become associated with the Islamic extremist militant group, also known as ISIS. It was replaced with Ivette for the 2016 season.

== Season effects ==
This is a table of all of the tropical cyclones that formed in the 2010 Pacific hurricane season. It includes their name, duration, peak classification and intensities, areas affected, damage, and death totals. Deaths in parentheses are additional and indirect (an example of an indirect death would be a traffic accident), but were still related to that storm. Damage and deaths include totals while the storm was extratropical, a wave, or a low, and all of the damage figures are in 2010 USD.

Saffir–Simpson scale
TD	TS	C1	C2	C3	C4	C5

2010 Pacific hurricane season statistics
Storm name	Dates active	Storm category at peak intensity	Max 1-min wind mph (km/h)	Min. press. (mbar)	Areas affected	Damage (US$)	Deaths	Ref(s).
Agatha	May 29–30	Tropical storm	45 (75)	1001	Southwestern Mexico, Central America	$1.11 billion	204	
Two-E	June 16–17	Tropical depression	35 (55)	1007	Southwestern Mexico	Minor	None	
Blas	June 17–21	Tropical storm	65 (100)	994	None	None	None	
Celia	June 18–28	Category 5 hurricane	160 (260)	921	Southwestern Mexico, Clipperton Island	None	None	
Darby	June 23–28	Category 3 hurricane	120 (195)	959	Southwestern Mexico	None	None	
Six-E	July 14–16	Tropical depression	35 (55)	1006	Western Mexico	None	None	
Estelle	August 6–10	Tropical storm	65 (100)	994	Southwestern Mexico, Northwestern Mexico	None	None	
Eight-E	August 20–21	Tropical depression	35 (55)	1003	None	None	None	
Frank	August 21–28	Category 1 hurricane	90 (150)	978	Southwestern Mexico, Western Mexico	$8.3 million	6	
Ten-E	September 3–4	Tropical depression	35 (55)	1003	None	None	None	
Eleven-E	September 3–4	Tropical depression	35 (55)	1004	Southwestern Mexico, Central America	$500 million	0 (57)	
Georgette	September 20–23	Tropical storm	40 (65)	999	Northwestern Mexico	$72,000	0 (1)	
Omeka	December 20–21	Tropical storm	50 (85)	997	Hawaii (after crossover)	None	None	
Season aggregates
13 systems	May 29 – December 21		160 (260)	921		$1.62 billion	210 (58)	

== See also ==
- Tropical cyclones in 2010
- 2010 Atlantic hurricane season
- 2010 Pacific typhoon season
- 2010 North Indian Ocean cyclone season
- South-West Indian Ocean cyclone seasons: 2009–10, 2010–11
- Australian region cyclone seasons: 2009–10, 2010–11
- South Pacific cyclone seasons: 2009–10, 2010–11
