= Timeline of the 2010 Pacific hurricane season =

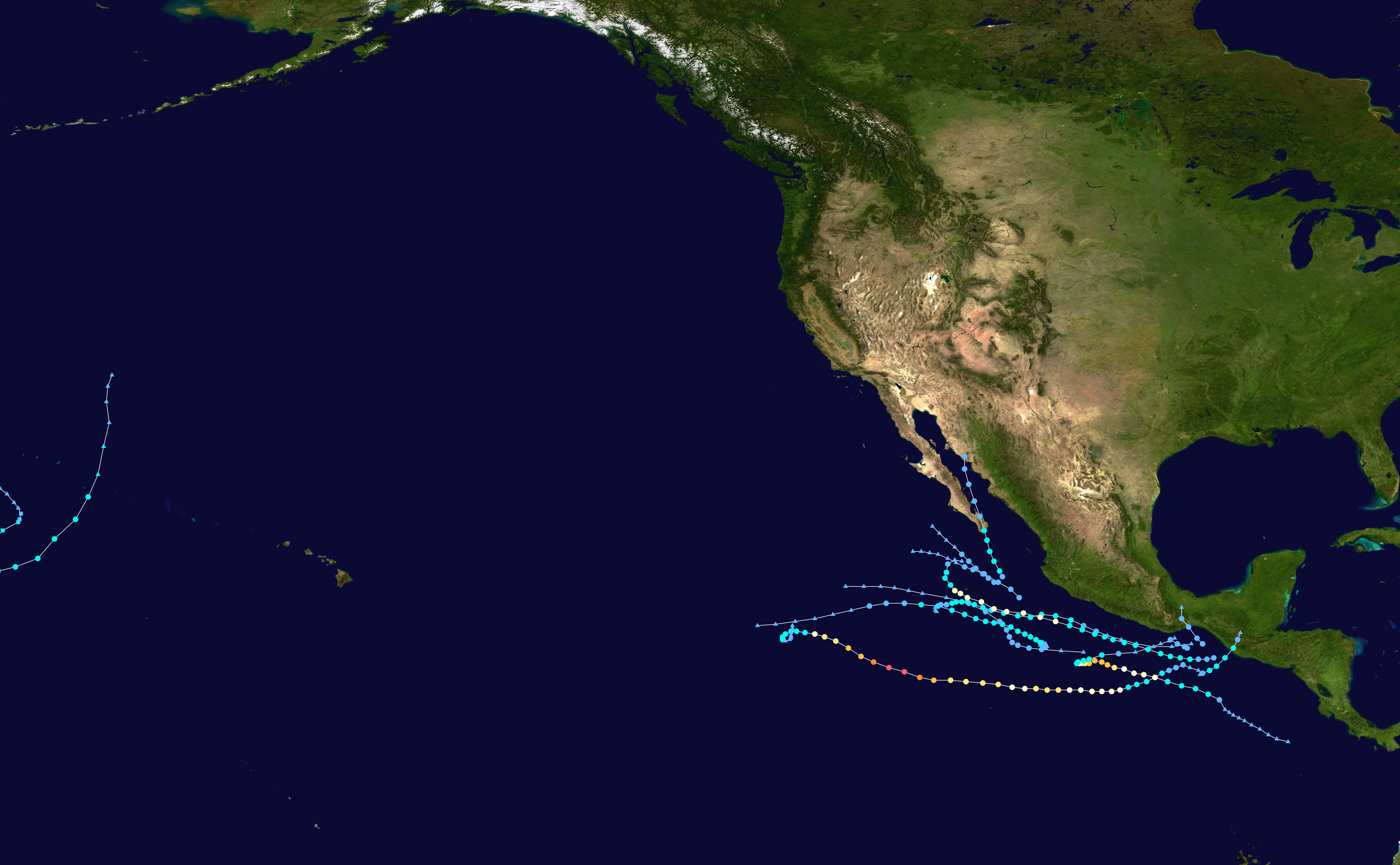
- Season summary map

Season boundaries
- First system formed: May 29, 2010
- Last system dissipated: December 21, 2010

Strongest system
- Name: Celia
- Maximum winds: 160 mph (260 km/h) (1-minute sustained)
- Lowest pressure: 921 mbar (hPa; 27.2 inHg)
Storm articles
- Tropical Storm Agatha
- Hurricane Celia (2010)
- Hurricane Frank (2010)
- Tropical Storm Hermine (2010)
- Tropical Storm Georgette (2010)

The 2010 Pacific hurricane season was one of the least active seasons on record, featuring the fewest named storms since 1977. The season officially started on May 15 in the eastern Pacific—east of 140°W—and on June 1 in the central Pacific—between the International Date Line and 140°W—and lasted until November 30. These dates typically cover the period of each year when most tropical cyclones form in the eastern Pacific basin. The season's first storm, Tropical Storm Agatha, developed on May 29; the season's final storm, Tropical Storm Omeka, degenerated on December 21.

The season began with record-breaking activity with four named storms, including two major hurricanes, developing by the end of June. Accumulated cyclone energy (ACE) (Note: Accumulated Cyclone Energy, broadly speaking, is a measure of the power of a hurricane multiplied by the length of time it existed, so storms that last a long time, as well as particularly strong hurricanes, have high ACEs.) values exceeded 300 percent of the average for the month of June. Activity abruptly diminished thereafter, with July, August, and September seeing record low storm development. The Eastern Pacific season proper ended with Tropical Storm Georgette's dissipation on September 23, a month before the climatological mean. The year's final cyclone, Omeka, developed in the off-season on December 18, marking a record-late formation date in the satellite-era.

This timeline documents tropical cyclone formations, strengthening, weakening, landfalls, extratropical transitions, and dissipations during the season. It includes information that was not released throughout the season, meaning that data from post-storm reviews by the National Hurricane Center and the Central Pacific Hurricane Center, such as a storm that was not initially warned upon, has been included.

The time stamp for each event is first stated using Coordinated Universal Time (UTC), the 24-hour clock where 00:00 = midnight UTC. The NHC uses both UTC and the time zone where the center of the tropical cyclone is currently located. Four time zones are utilized in the basin: Central for storms east of 106°W, Mountain between 114.9°W and 106°W, Pacific between 140°W and 115°W, and Hawaii–Aleutian for storms between the International Date Line and 140°W. In this timeline, the respective area time is included in parentheses. Additionally, figures for maximum sustained winds and position estimates are rounded to the nearest 5 units (miles, or kilometers), following National Hurricane Center practice. Direct wind observations are rounded to the nearest whole number. Atmospheric pressures are listed to the nearest millibar and nearest hundredth of an inch of mercury.

== Timeline of events ==
=== May ===
May 15

- The 2010 Pacific hurricane season officially begins.

May 29

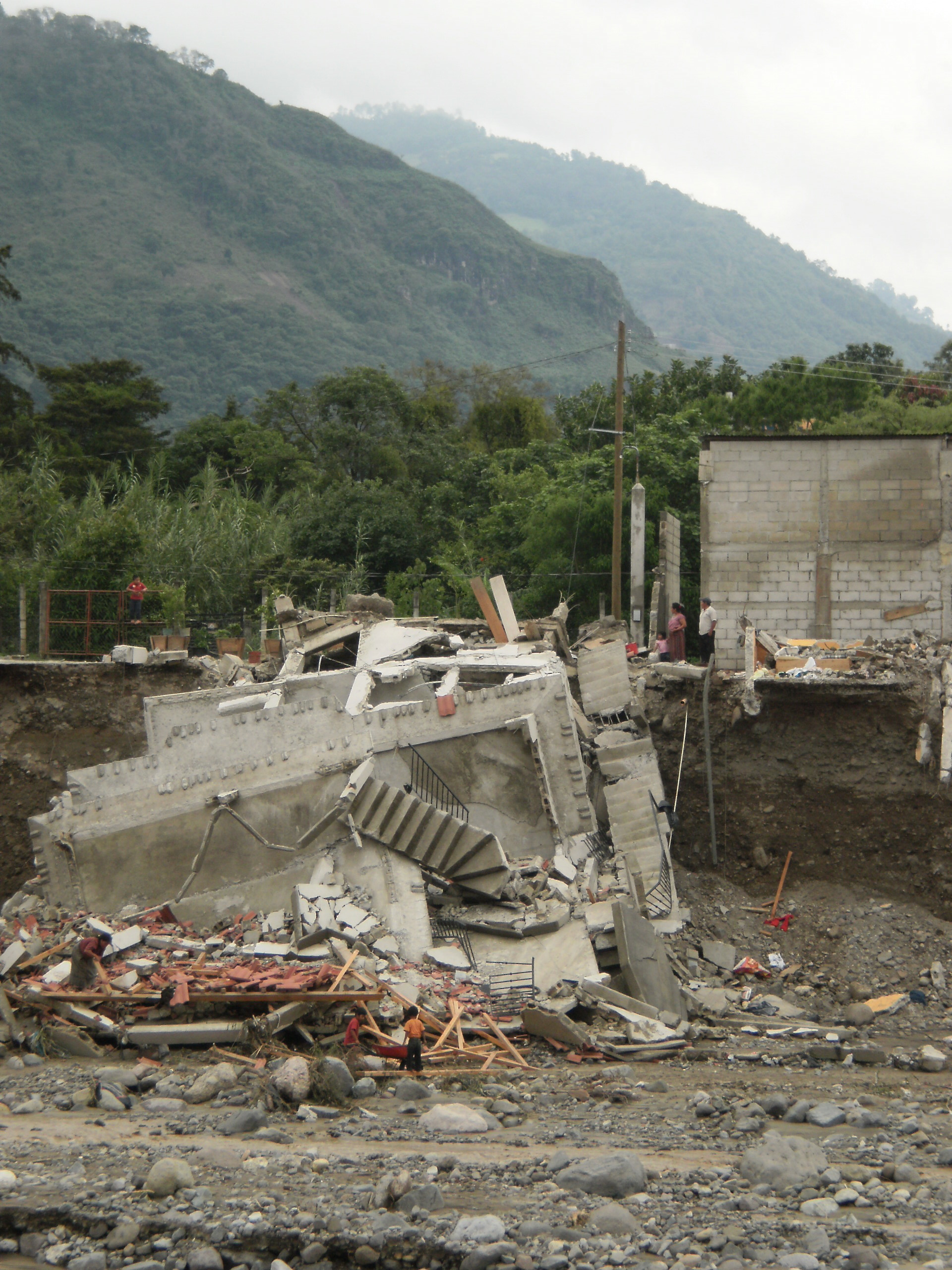
Damage wrought by Tropical Storm Agatha in Guatemala

- 00:00 UTC (7:00 p.m. CDT, May 28) – Tropical Depression One-E develops out of a broad area of low pressure roughly 180 mi (290 km) (Note: The figures for maximum sustained winds and position estimates are rounded to the nearest 5 units (knots, miles, or kilometers), following the convention used in the National Hurricane Center's operational products for each storm. All other units are rounded to the nearest digit.) southwest of Tapachula, Mexico.
- 06:00 UTC (1:00 a.m. CDT) – Tropical Depression One-E intensifies into a tropical storm and is named Agatha while located about 235 mi (380 km) southwest of Guatemala City, Guatemala.
- 18:00 UTC (1:00 p.m. CDT) – Tropical Storm Agatha reaches its peak intensity with winds of 45 mph (70 km/h) and a barometric pressure of 1001 mbar (hPa; 29.56 inHg).
- 22:30 UTC (5:30 p.m. CDT) – Tropical Storm Agatha makes landfall near Champerico, Guatemala, just south of the Mexico–Guatemala border, while at peak strength.

May 30

- 06:00 UTC (1:00 a.m. CDT) – Agatha weakens to a tropical depression.
- 12:00 UTC (7:00 a.m. CDT) – Tropical Depression Agatha degenerates into a remnant low before subsequently dissipating six hours later over the high terrain of Guatemala.

=== June ===
June 1

- The 2010 Central Pacific hurricane season officially begins.

June 16

- 06:00 UTC (1:00 a.m. CDT) – Tropical Depression Two-E develops out of a tropical wave roughly 110 mi (175 km) south of Salina Cruz, Mexico.
- 18:00 UTC (1:00 p.m. CDT) – Tropical Depression Two-E attains its peak intensity with winds of 35 mph (55 km/h) and a pressure of 1007 mbar (hPa; 29.74 inHg).

June 17

- 06:00 UTC (1:00 a.m. CDT) – Tropical Depression Two-E rapidly dissipates off the coast of Mexico.
- 06:00 UTC (1:00 a.m. CDT) – Tropical Depression Three-E develops out of an area of low pressure roughly 305 mi (490 km) south-southwest of Manzanillo, Mexico.
- 12:00 UTC (7:00 a.m. CDT) – Observations from the ship Maersk Dhahran indicate that Three-E intensified into a tropical storm; the system was accordingly assigned the name Blas.

June 18

- 18:00 UTC (1:00 p.m. CDT) – Tropical Depression Four-E develops out of large, well-defined low-pressure area located about 370 mi (595 km) southeast of Acapulco, Mexico.

June 19

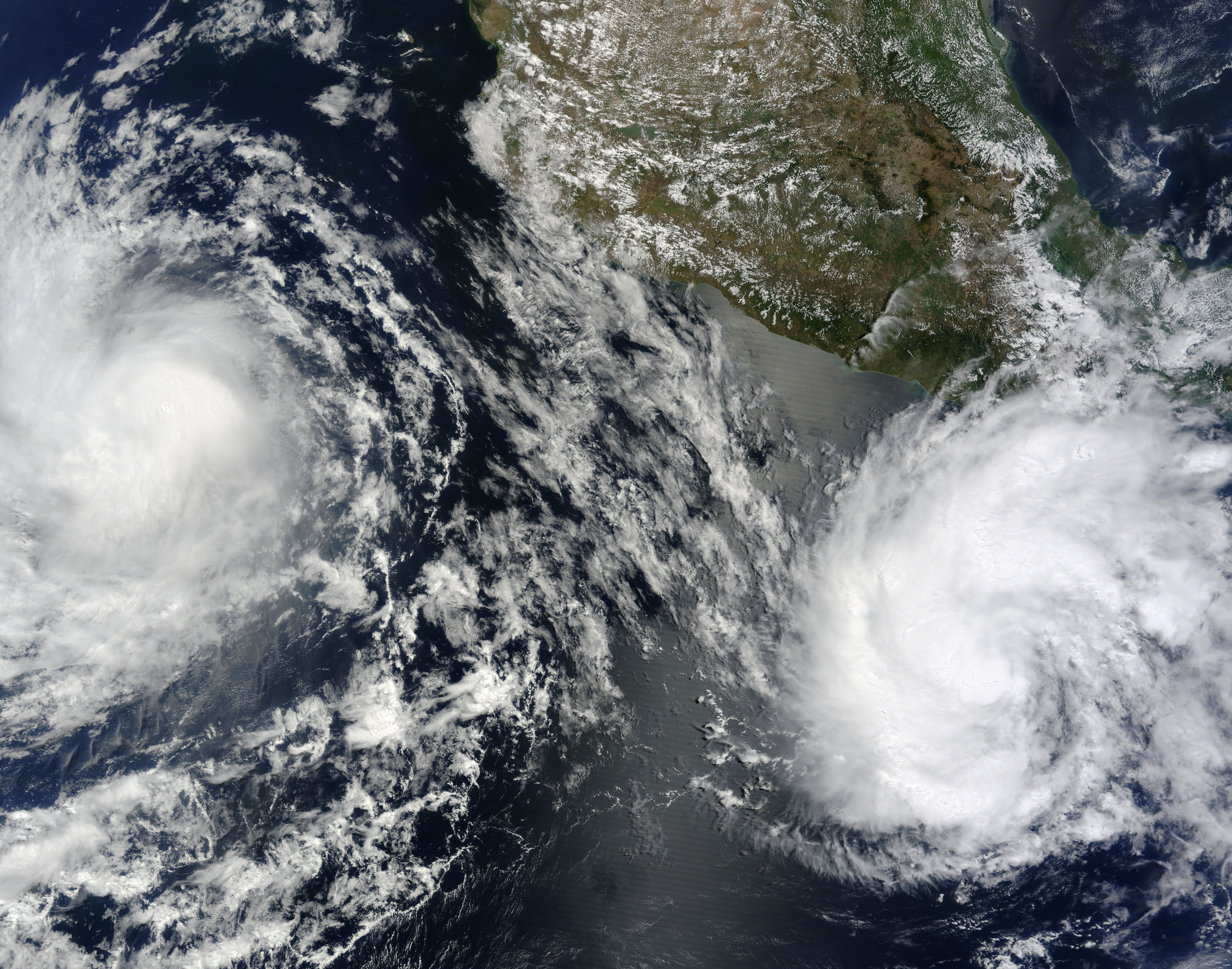
Tropical Storms Blas (left) and Celia (right) on June 19

- 12:00 UTC (6:00 a.m. MDT) – Tropical Storm Blas reaches its peak intensity with winds of 65 mph (105 km/h) and a pressure of 994 mbar (hPa; 29.35 inHg) while located about 445 mi (715 km) south of the southern tip of Baja California Sur.
- 12:00 UTC (7:00 a.m. CDT) – Tropical Depression Four-E intensifies into Tropical Storm Celia while situated roughly 335 mi (540 km) south-southeast of Acapulco, Mexico.

June 20

- 18:00 UTC (1:00 p.m. CDT) – Tropical Storm Celia intensifies into a Category 1 hurricane on the Saffir–Simpson hurricane wind scale while located 360 mi (580 km) south of Acapulco, Mexico.

June 21

- 00:00 UTC (5:00 p.m. PDT, June 20) – Tropical Storm Blas weakens to a tropical depression about 560 mi (900 km) southwest of the southern tip of Baja California Sur.
- 18:00 UTC (11:00 a.m. PDT) – Tropical Depression Blas degenerates into a non-convective remnant low roughly 710 mi (1,145 km) southwest of the southern tip of Baja California Sur.

June 22

- 06:00 UTC (1:00 a.m. CDT) – Hurricane Celia reaches Category 2 status and its initial peak intensity with winds of 100 mph (160 km/h) and a pressure of 973 mbar (hPa; 28.73 inHg).

June 23

- 00:00 UTC (6:00 p.m. MDT, June 22) – Hurricane Celia weakens to Category 1 strength approximately 535 mi (860 km) south-southwest of Manzanillo, Mexico.
- 00:00 UTC (7:00 p.m. CDT, June 22) – Tropical Depression Five-E develops from an area of showers and thunderstorms about 380 mi (610 km) south-southeast of Salina Cruz, Mexico.
- 06:00 UTC (1:00 a.m. CDT) – Tropical Depression Five-E strengthens into Tropical Storm Darby about 350 mi (565 km) south-southeast of Salina Cruz, Mexico.
- 12:00 UTC (6:00 a.m. MDT) – Hurricane Celia regains Category 2 intensity while located 565 mi (910 km) southwest of Manzanillo, Mexico.

Infrared satellite loop of Hurricane Celia intensifying on June 24

June 24

- 06:00 UTC (1:00 a.m. CDT) – Tropical Storm Darby rapidly strengthens into a Category 1 hurricane approximately 295 mi (475 km) south-southwest of Salina Cruz, Mexico.
- 12:00 UTC (6:00 a.m. MDT) – Hurricane Celia intensifies into Category 3 hurricane about 470 mi (755 km) south-southwest of Socorro Island.
- 18:00 UTC (12:00 p.m. MDT) – Hurricane Celia rapid intensifies into a Category 4 hurricane about 485 mi (780 km) south-southwest of Socorro Island.

June 25

- 00:00 UTC (5:00 p.m. PDT, June 24) – Hurricane Celia reaches its peak intensity as a Category 5 hurricane with winds of 160 mph (255 km/h) and a pressure of 921 mbar (hPa; 27.20 inHg), about 500 mi (805 km) southwest of Socorro Island.
- 06:00 UTC (1:00 a.m. CDT) – Hurricane Darby intensifies into a Category 2 hurricane about 255 mi (410 km) south of Acapulco, Mexico.
- 12:00 UTC (5:00 a.m. PDT) – Stable environmental conditions and cooler waters result in Hurricane Celia weakening to a Category 4 system approximately 565 mi (910 km) southwest of Socorro Island.
- 12:00 UTC (7:00 a.m. CDT) – Hurricane Darby undergoes a second phase of rapid deepening and reaches Category 3 intensity about 250 mi (400 km) south-southwest of Acapulco, Mexico.
- 18:00 UTC (11:00 a.m. PDT) – Hurricane Celia weakens to Category 3 strength about 595 mi (960 km) southwest of Socorro Island.
- 21:00 UTC (4:00 p.m. CDT) – Hurricane Darby attains its peak intensity with winds of 120 mph (195 km/h) and a pressure of 959 mbar (hPa; 28.32 inHg) approximately 245 mi (395 km) southwest of Acapulco, Mexico.

June 26

- 06:00 UTC (11:00 p.m. PDT, June 25) – Hurricane Celia weakens to Category 2 strength about 665 mi (1,070 km) west-southwest of Socorro Island.
- 12:00 UTC (7:00 a.m. CDT) – Increasing wind shear stemming from the large circulation of Hurricane Alex over the Gulf of Mexico causes Darby to weaken to a Category 2 hurricane about 290 mi (465 km) southwest of Acapulco, Mexico.
- 18:00 UTC (11:00 a.m. PDT) – Hurricane Celia weakens to Category 1 strength about 745 mi (1,200 km) west-southwest of Socorro Island.

June 27

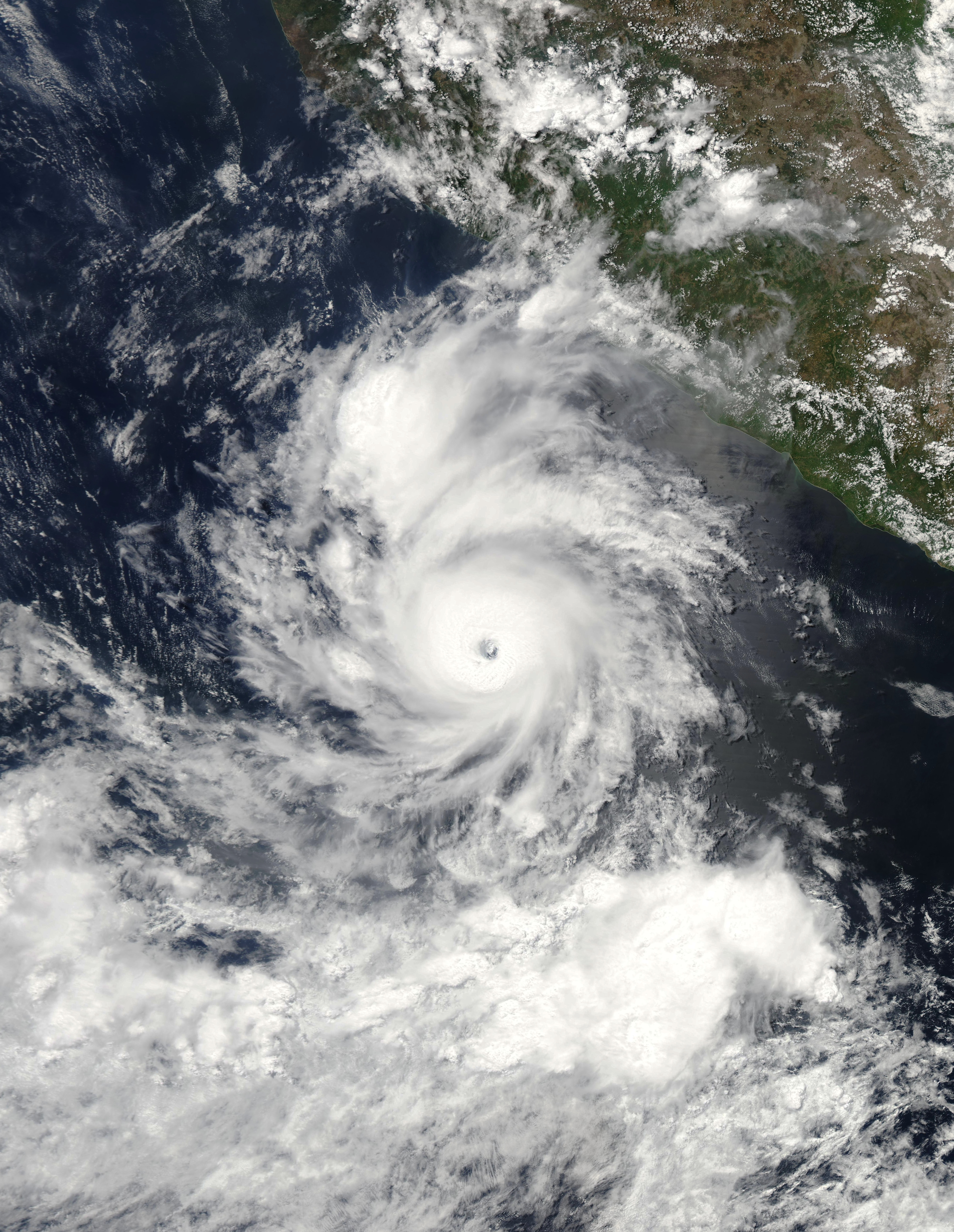
The small Hurricane Darby situated south of Mexico on June 25.

- 00:00 UTC (5:00 p.m. PDT, June 26) – Hurricane Celia weakens to a tropical storm roughly 790 mi (1,270 km) west-southwest of Socorro Island.
- 00:00 UTC (7:00 p.m. CDT, June 26) – Hurricane Darby weakens to a Category 1 hurricane approximately 305 mi (490 km) southwest of Acapulco, Mexico.
- 06:00 UTC (1:00 a.m. CDT) – Hurricane Darby weakens to a tropical storm roughly 315 mi (505 km) southwest of Acapulco, Mexico.

June 28

- 12:00 UTC (7:00 a.m. CDT) – After doubling back to the east, Tropical Storm Darby weakens to a tropical depression about 185 mi (300 km) south of Acapulco, Mexico.
- 18:00 UTC (11:00 a.m. PDT) – Tropical Storm Celia degenerates into a non-convective remnant low approximately 1,035 mi (1,665 km) west-southwest of the southern tip of Baja California Sur.
- 18:00 UTC (1:00 p.m. CDT) – Tropical Depression Darby degrades into a remnant low about 190 mi (305 km) south-southeast of Acapulco, Mexico.

=== July ===
July 14

- 12:00 UTC (7:00 a.m. CDT) – Tropical Depression Six-E develops from a well-defined low about 330 mi (530 km) south-southwest of Manzanillo, Mexico. It simultaneously reaches its peak intensity with winds of 35 mph (55 km/h) and a pressure of 1006 mbar (hPa; 29.71 inHg).

July 16

- 18:00 UTC (12:00 a.m. MDT) – Tropical Depression Six-E degenerates into a remnant low about 100 mi (160 km) west-southwest of Socorro Island.

=== August ===
August 6

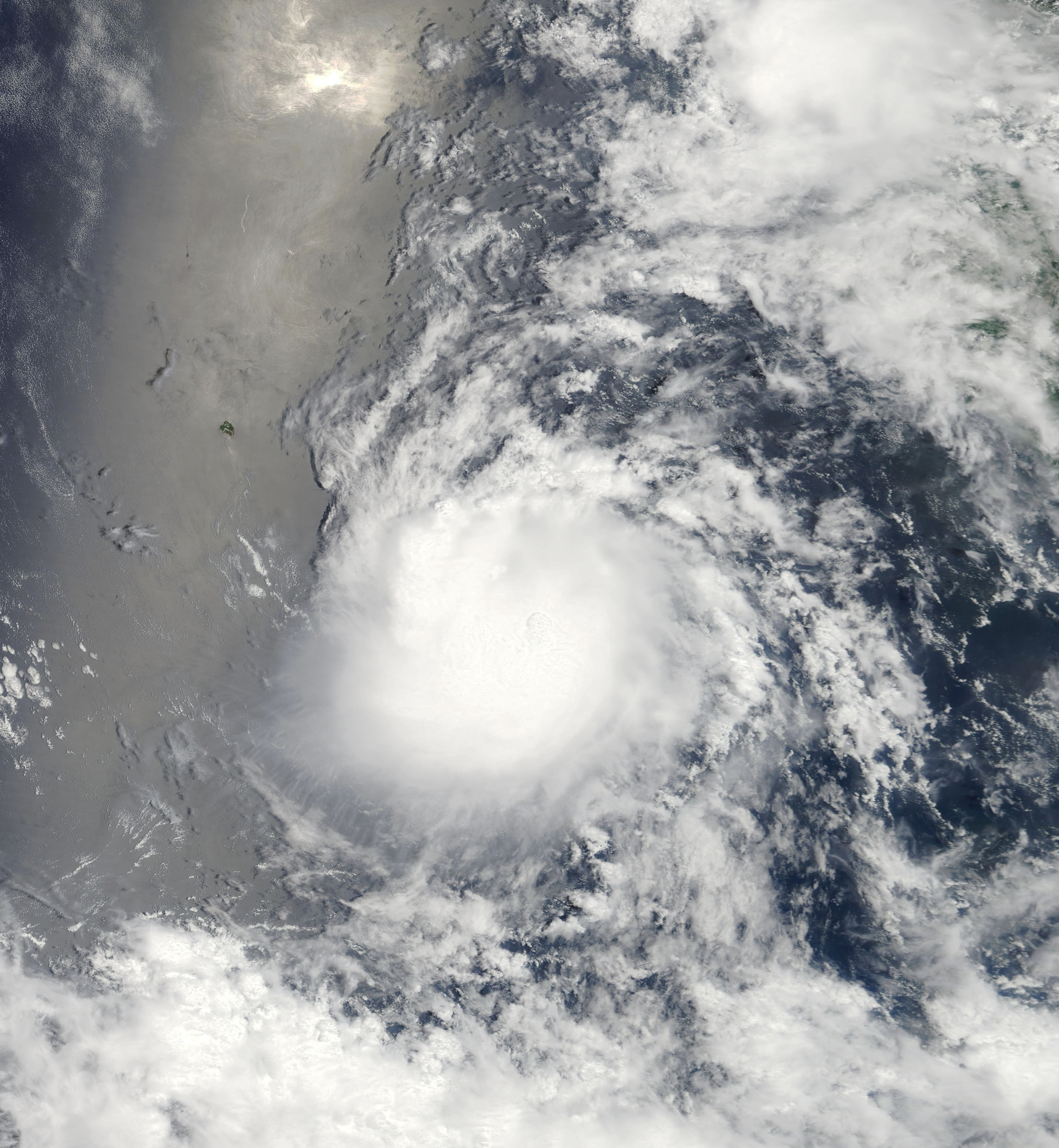
Tropical Storm Estelle at peak intensity on August 6

- 00:00 UTC (7:00 p.m. PDT, August 5) – Tropical Depression Seven-E develops from a weak low roughly 160 mi (255 km) southwest of Acapulco, Mexico.
- 12:00 UTC (7:00 a.m. PDT) – Tropical Depression Seven-E intensifies into Tropical Storm Estelle approximately 240 mi (385 km) west of Acapulco, Mexico.

August 8

- 00:00 UTC (6:00 p.m. MDT, August 7) – Tropical Storm Estelle reaches its peak intensity with winds of 65 mph (105 km/h) and a pressure of 994 mbar (hPa; 29.35 inHg) while situated 150 mi (240 km) southeast of Socorro Island.

August 9

- 18:00 UTC (12:00 p.m. MDT) – Tropical Storm Estelle weakens to a tropical depression roughly 115 mi (185 km) southwest of Socorro Island.

August 10

- 06:00 UTC (12:00 a.m. MDT) – Tropical Depression Estelle degenerates into a remnant low about 170 mi (275 km) southwest of Socorro Island.

August 20

- 06:00 UTC (12:00 a.m. MDT) – Tropical Depression Eight-E develops 185 mi (300 km) west-southwest of Manzanillo, Mexico.
- 18:00 UTC (12:00 p.m. MDT) – Tropical Depression Eight-E reaches its peak intensity with winds of 35 mph (55 km/h) and a pressure of 1003 mbar (hPa; 29.62 inHg) while located about 285 mi (460 km) west of Manzanillo, Mexico.

August 21

- 18:00 UTC (12:00 p.m. MDT) – Tropical Depression Eight-E degenerates into a non-convective remnant low approximately 190 mi (305 km) southwest of the southern tip of Baja California Sur.
- 1800 UTC (1:00 p.m. CDT) – Tropical Depression Nine-E forms from an area of disturbed weather roughly 205 mi (330 km) southeast of Salina Cruz, Mexico.

August 22

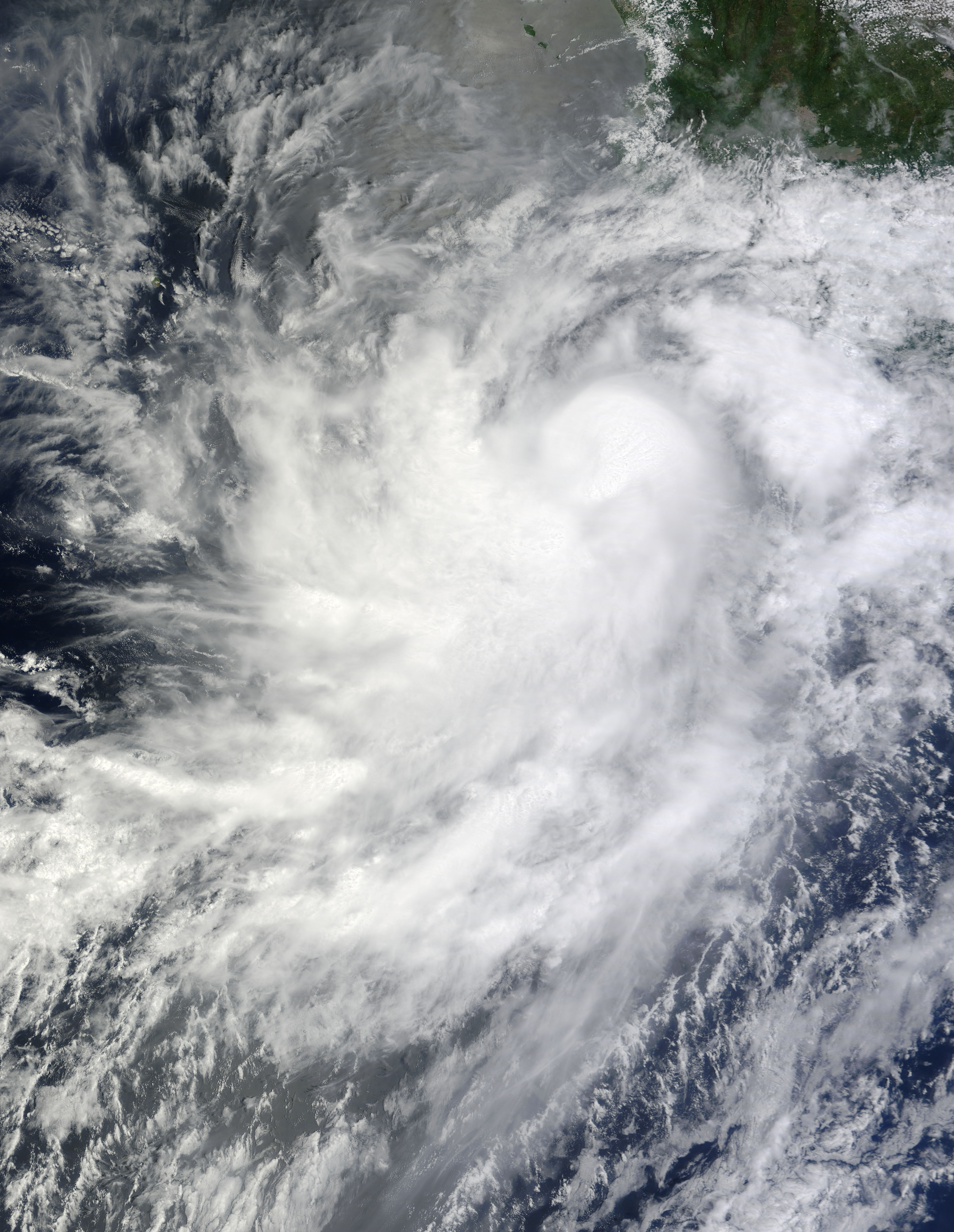
Hurricane Frank off the coast of Mexico on August 25

- 12:00 UTC (7:00 a.m. CDT) – Tropical Depression Nine-E strengthens into a tropical storm and receives the name Frank while situated about 165 mi (265 km) south of Salina Cruz, Mexico.

August 25

- 12:00 UTC (7:00 a.m. CDT) – Tropical Storm Frank intensifies into a Category 1 hurricane about 175 mi (280 km) south of Manzanillo, Mexico.

August 26

- 18:00 UTC (12:00 p.m. MDT) – Hurricane Frank reaches its peak intensity with winds of 90 mph (145 km/h) and a pressure of 978 mbar (hPa; 28.88 inHg) approximately 90 mi (145 km) southeast of Socorro Island.

August 27

- 06:00 UTC (12:00 a.m. MDT) – Hurricane Frank makes its closest approach to Socorro Island, passing within 35 mi (55 km) to the southwest.
- 18:00 UTC (12:00 p.m. MDT) – Hurricane Frank weakens to a tropical storm roughly 75 mi (120 km) west-northwest of Socorro Island.

August 28

- 12:00 UTC (6:00 a.m. MDT) – Tropical Storm Frank weakens to a tropical depression about 145 mi (235 km) north-northwest of Socorro Island.
- 18:00 UTC (12:00 p.m. MDT) – Tropical Depression Frank degenerates into a remnant low approximately 150 mi (240 km) north-northwest of Socorro Island.

=== September ===
September 3

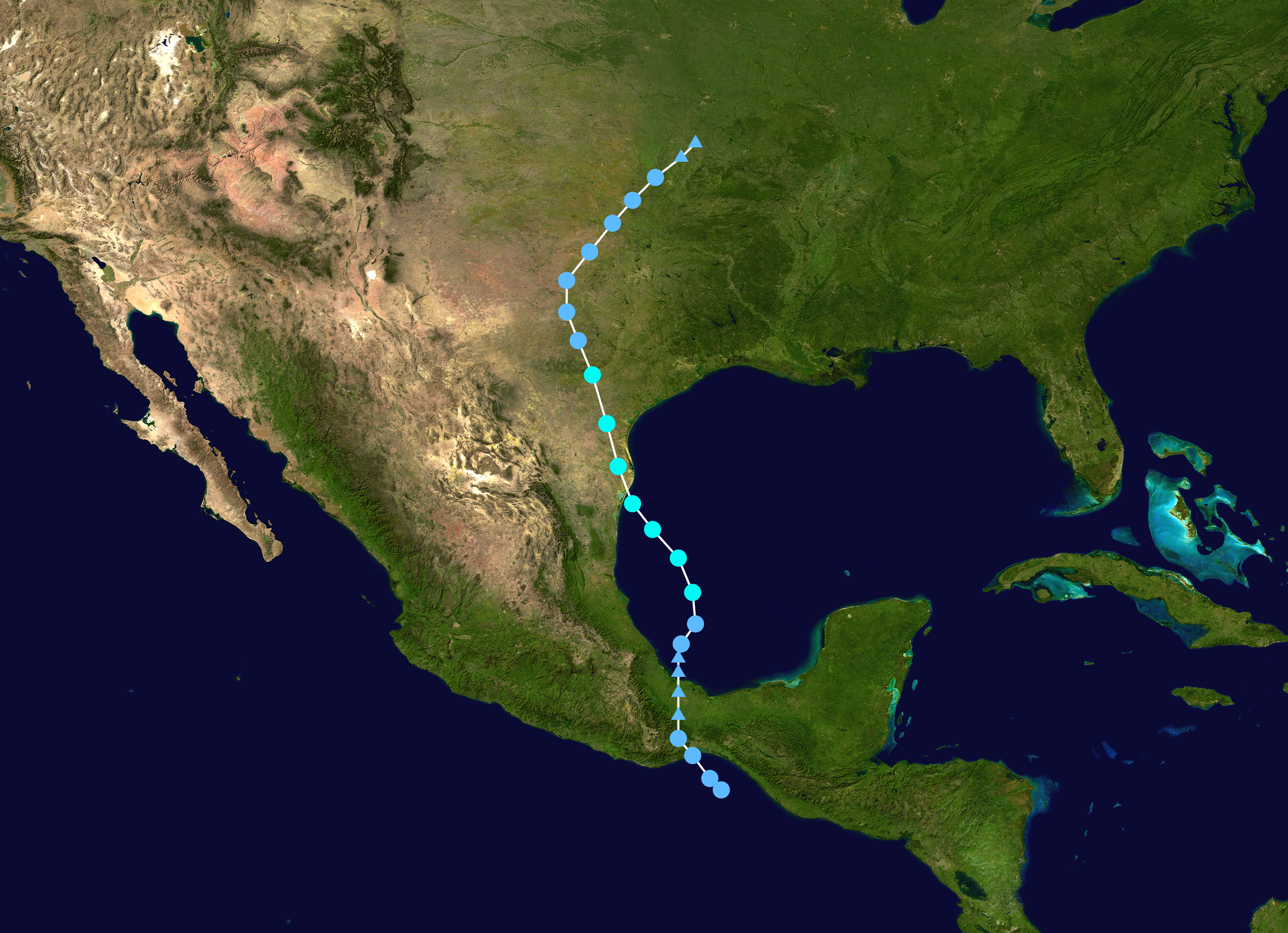
Track of Tropical Depression Eleven-E, later Tropical Storm Hermine, stretching from the Gulf of Tehuantepec northward to the Midwestern United States

- 00:00 UTC (6:00 p.m. MDT, September 2) – Tropical Depression Ten-E develops from a tropical wave about 255 mi (410 km) south-southeast of the southern tip of Baja California Sur. It simultaneously reaches its peak intensity with winds of 35 mph (55 km/h) and a pressure of 1003 mbar (hPa; 29.62 inHg).
- 18:00 UTC (1:00 p.m. CDT) – Tropical Depression Eleven-E forms roughly 115 mi (185 km) southeast of Salina Cruz, Mexico.

September 4

- 07:00 UTC (8:00 p.m. CDT, September 3) – Tropical Depression Eleven-E makes landfall near Salina Cruz, Mexico, at its peak intensity with winds of 35 mph (55 km/h).
- 12:00 UTC (6:00 a.m. MDT) – Tropical Depression Ten-E degenerates into a remnant low roughly 185 mi (300 km) west-southwest of the southern tip of Baja California Sur.
- 18:00 UTC (1:00 p.m. CDT) – Tropical Depression Eleven-E degenerates into a remnant low while crossing the Isthmus of Tehuantepec.

September 5

- 18:00 UTC (1:00 p.m. CDT) – After emerging over the Bay of Campeche in the Atlantic basin, the remnants of Eleven-E regenerate into a tropical depression and later becomes Tropical Storm Hermine.

September 20

- 12:00 UTC (6:00 a.m. MDT) – Tropical Depression Twelve-E develops from a tropical wave approximately 240 mi (385 km) south-southeast of Cabo San Lucas, Mexico.
- 18:00 UTC (12:00 p.m. MDT) – Tropical Depression Twelve-E intensifies into Tropical Storm Georgette, the final named storm in the East Pacific proper, while located about 225 mi (360 km) west of Puerto Vallarta, Mexico.

September 21

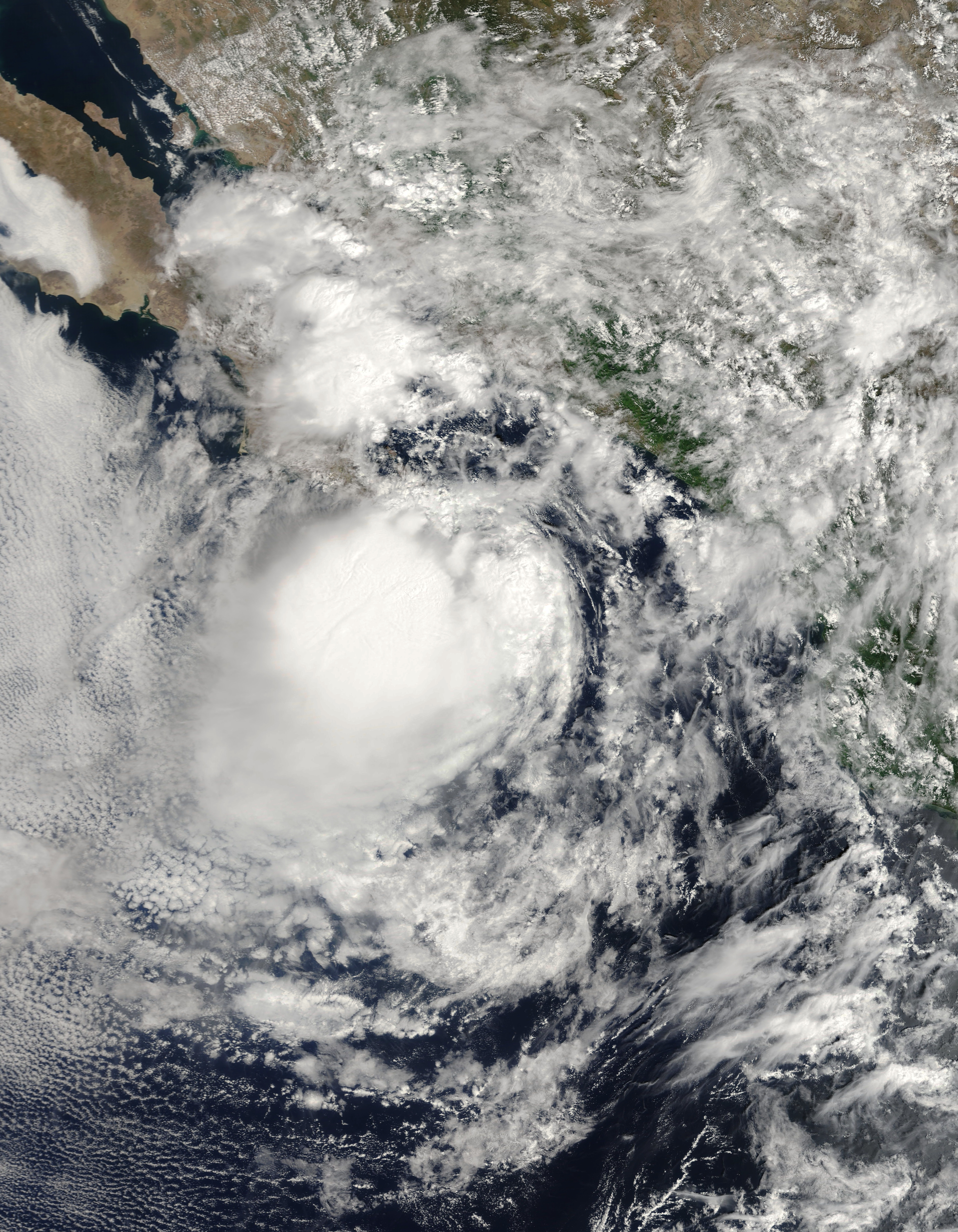
Tropical Storm Georgette at peak intensity on September 21

- 12:00 UTC (6:00 a.m. MDT) – Tropical Storm Georgette reaches its peak intensity with winds of 40 mph (65 km/h) and a minimum pressure of 999 mbar (hPa; 29.50 inHg).
- 18:00 UTC (12:00 p.m. MDT) – Tropical Storm Georgette makes landfall near San José del Cabo, Mexico, with winds of 40 mph (65 km/h).

September 22

- 00:00 UTC (6:00 p.m. MDT, September 21) – Tropical Storm Georgette weakens to a tropical depression shortly before emerging over the Gulf of California to the east of La Paz.
- 22:00 UTC (4:00 p.m. MDT) – Tropical Depression Georgette makes landfall near San Carlos, Mexico, with winds of 35 mph (55 km/h).

September 23

- 06:00 UTC (12:00 a.m. MDT) – Tropical Depression Georgette dissipates over the mountainous terrain of northwestern Mexico.

=== October ===
(No tropical cyclones developed in October).

=== November ===
(No tropical cyclones developed in November).

November 30

- The 2010 Central and Eastern Pacific hurricane seasons officially end.

=== December ===
December 18

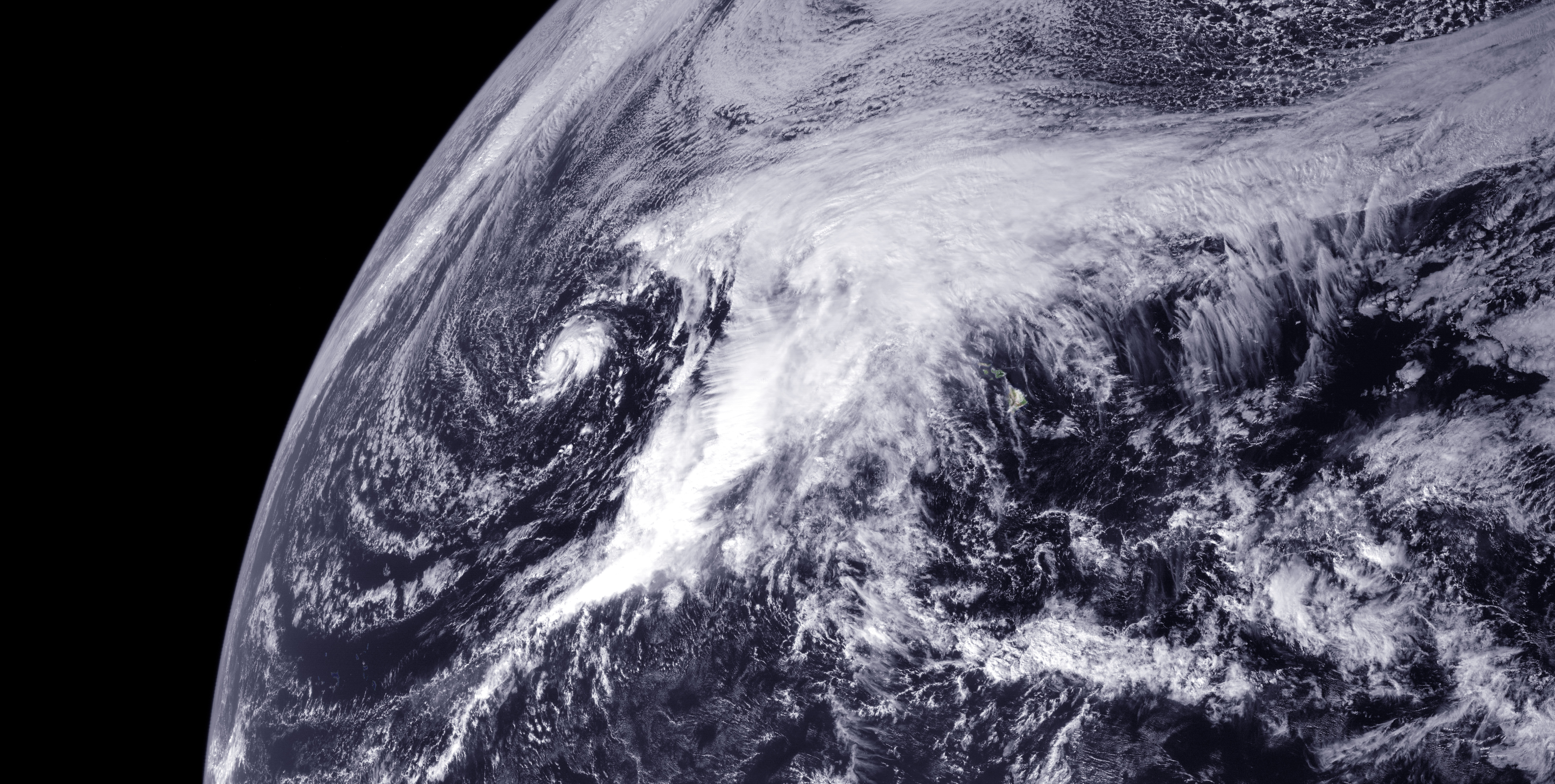
Subtropical Storm Omeka embedded within a larger extratropical system to the west of Hawaii on December 19.

- 00:00 UTC (2:00 p.m. HST, December 17) – A subtropical depression develops from an extratropical cyclone approximately 1,330 mi (2,140 km) west-northwest of Honolulu, Hawaii.
- 12:00 UTC (2:00 a.m. HST) – The subtropical depression strengthens into a subtropical storm.

December 19

- 00:00 UTC (2:00 p.m. HST, December 18) – the subtropical storm crosses the International Date Line, exiting the basin.

December 20

- 06:00 UTC (8:00 p.m. HST, December 19) – The subtropical storm again crosses the International Date Line, re-entering the basin with winds of 50 mph (80 km/h) and a pressure of 997 mbar (hPa; 29.44 inHg); around this time, the storm transitions to a tropical storm and is later assigned the name Omeka.

December 21

- 06:00 UTC (8:00 p.m. HST, December 20) – Tropical Storm Omeka makes its closest approach to land as a tropical cyclone, passing roughly 45 mi (70 km) south-southeast of Lisianski Island, Hawaii.
- 12:00 UTC (2:00 a.m. HST) – Tropical Storm Omeka degenerates into a non-convective remnant low approximately 90 mi (145 km) northeast of Lisianski Island, Hawaii.

== See also ==
- 2010 Pacific hurricane season
- Pacific hurricane
- Timeline of the 2010 Atlantic hurricane season
