= List of storms named Georgette =

The name Georgette has been used for eleven tropical cyclones in the Eastern Pacific Ocean. One of these crossed into the Western Pacific Ocean where it degraded into a tropical wave then regenerated into a severe tropical storm.

- Tropical Storm Georgette (1967) – never affected land
- Tropical Storm Georgette (1971) – remained over the open ocean
- Tropical Storm Georgette (1975) – had no impact on land
- Hurricane Georgette (1980) – had no impact
- Tropical Storm Georgette (1986) – weak storm that degraded into a tropical wave and crossed into the Western Pacific where it reorganized
- Hurricane Georgette (1992) – Category 2 hurricane, remained over the open ocean
- Hurricane Georgette (1998) – Category 3 major hurricane, never affected land
- Tropical Storm Georgette (2004) – remained over the open ocean
- Tropical Storm Georgette (2010) – short-lived storm that struck Baja California Sur
- Hurricane Georgette (2016) – Category 4 major hurricane, churned in the open ocean
- Tropical Storm Georgette (2022) – minimal storm which never affected land

In the Western Pacific:

- Severe Tropical Storm Georgette (1986) (T8611, 08E) – developed from the Eastern Pacific system of the same name and remained in the open sea

In the South-West Indian Ocean:

- Cyclone Georgette (1968) – a Category 3 tropical cyclone that struck northern Madagascar.

== See also ==
- List of storms named George
- List of storms named Georges
