= List of storms named Georges =

The name Georges was used for two tropical cyclones in the Atlantic Ocean.

- Hurricane Georges (1980) – Category 1 hurricane looped across the north Atlantic Ocean without causing any reported damage.
- Hurricane Georges (1998) – Category 4 hurricane that wrought death and destruction across the Caribbean and Gulf of Mexico.

The name Georges was retired after the hurricane in 1998 and was replaced by Gaston in 2004.

== See also ==
- List of storms named George
- List of storms named Georgette
