= List of storms named George =

The name George has been used for three tropical cyclones in the Atlantic Ocean, one in the Australian region and one in the South Pacific Ocean.

In the Atlantic:

- 1947 Fort Lauderdale hurricane, designated "George" by the Weather Bureau office in Miami
- Hurricane George (1950), developed southeast of Bermuda, intensified to Category 2 hurricane and became extratropical south of Newfoundland
- Tropical Storm George (1951), struck Bay of Campeche and made landfall in Tampico, Mexico

In the Australian region:

- Cyclone George (2007), developed in the Joseph Bonaparte Gulf, intensified to a Category 5 severe tropical cyclone (Australian scale) and hit the Pilbara coast

In the South Pacific Ocean:

- Tropical Depression George (1976) – a tropical depression that minimal affected in the Queensland.

== See also ==
- List of storms named Georges
- List of storms named Georgette
