= Tropical Storm Georgette (2010) =

Pacific tropical storm in 2010

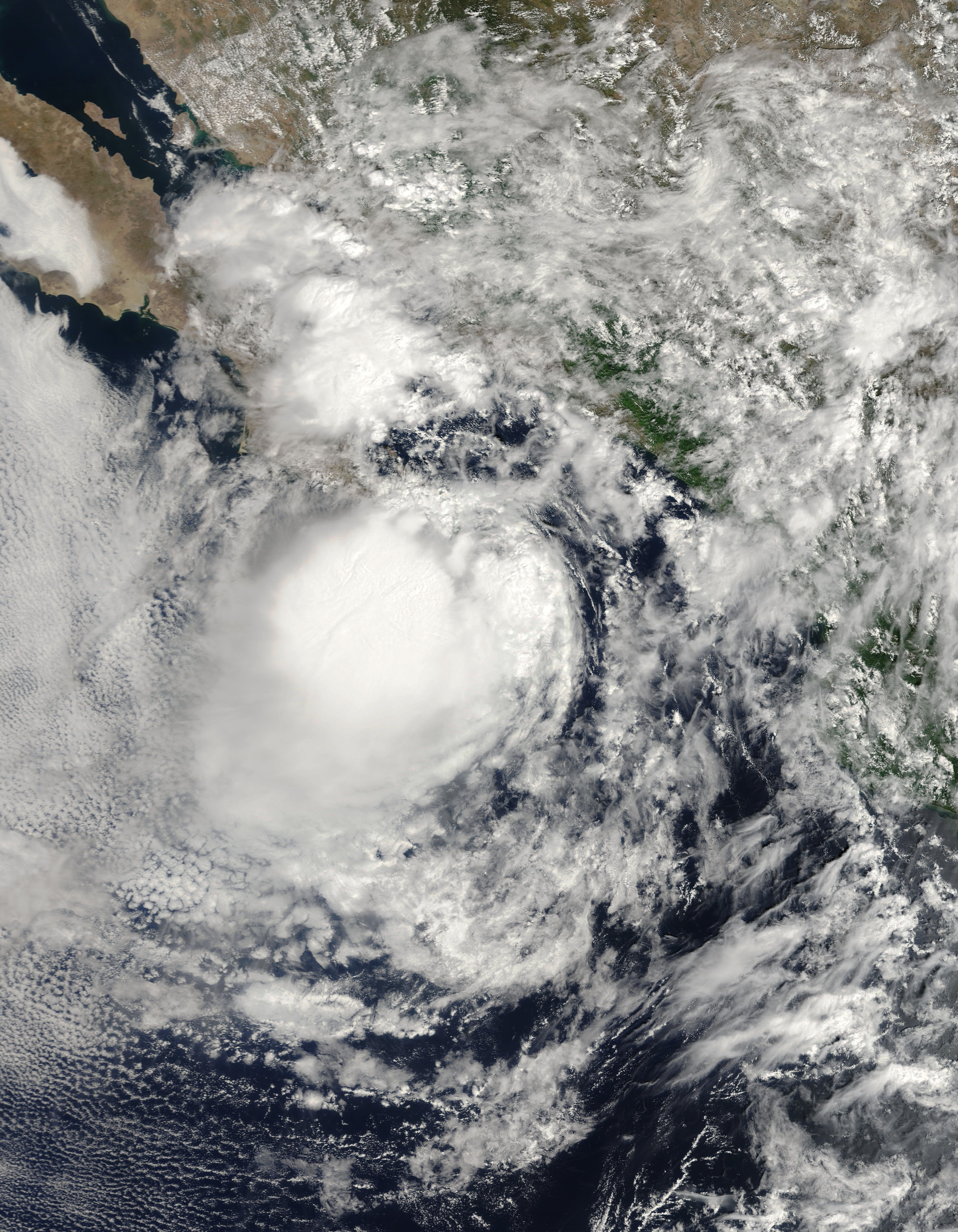
- Tropical Storm Georgette near landfall over Baja California on September 21

Meteorological history
- Formed: September 20, 2010
- Dissipated: September 23, 2010

Tropical storm
- 1-minute sustained (SSHWS/NWS)
- Highest winds: 40 mph (65 km/h)
- Lowest pressure: 999 mbar (hPa); 29.50 inHg

Overall effects
- Fatalities: 1 total
- Damage: US$72,000
- Areas affected: Baja California Sur, Sinaloa, Sonora, and New Mexico
- IBTrACS /
- Part of the 2010 Pacific hurricane season

Tropical Storm Georgette was a short-lived tropical storm that struck Baja California Sur in September 2010. The seventh named storm (and final in the eastern Pacific proper) of the inactive 2010 Pacific hurricane season, Georgette originated from an area of disturbed weather over the eastern Pacific ocean on September 20. The next day, the system was upgraded into a tropical storm a short distance south of Baja California Sur. As the storm moved over the peninsula, it weakened to a tropical depression. It continued north and as such made landfall on mainland Mexico on September 22. Georgette dissipated early the next day while located inland over Sonora. Although officials noted the threat for heavy rainfall across northwest Mexico and Baja California, damage was minimal and no deaths were reported in the country. However, remnant moisture moved into New Mexico, producing flooding that killed one person.

== Meteorological history ==
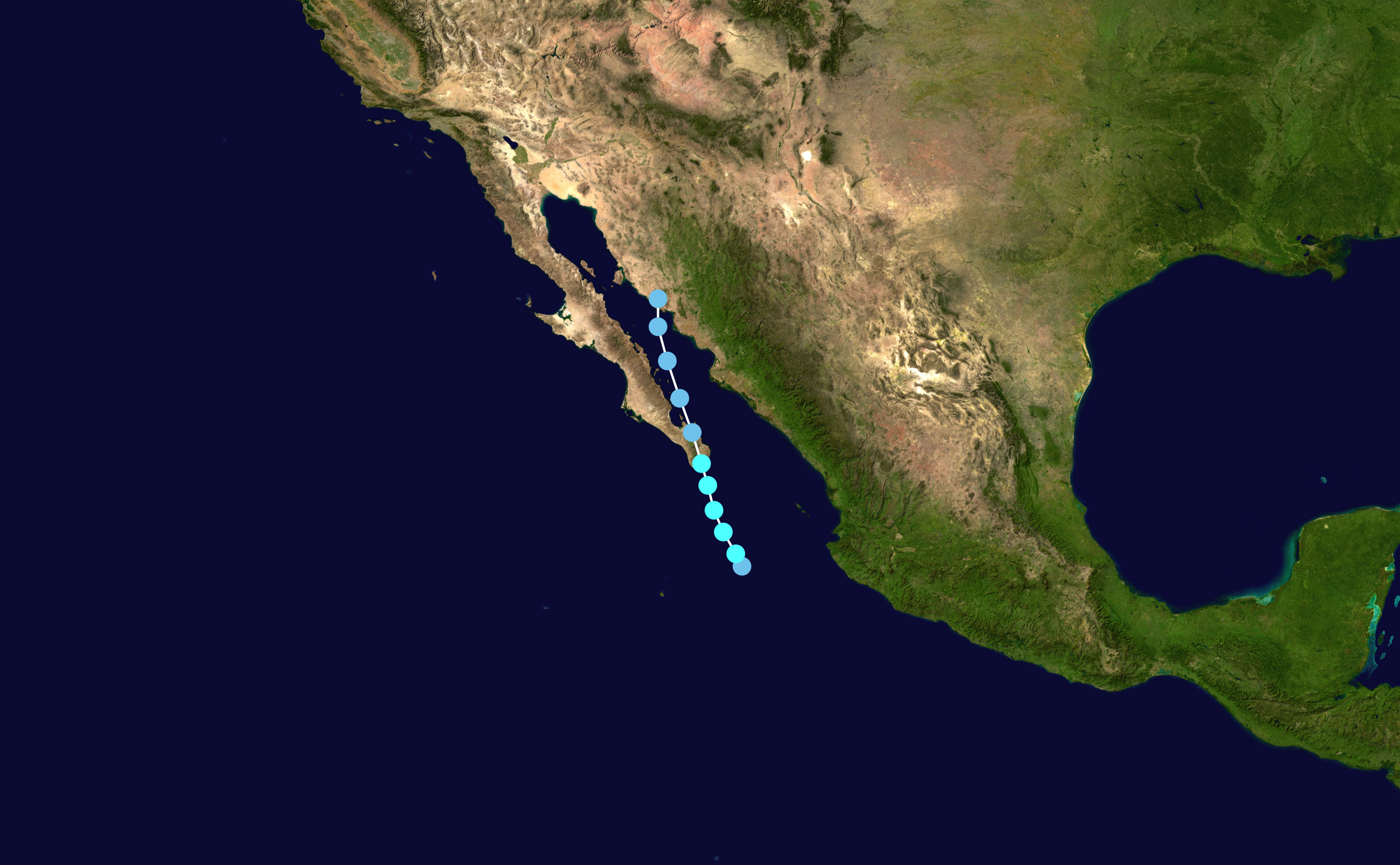
Map plotting the storm's track and intensity, according to the Saffir–Simpson scale Map key Saffir–Simpson scale Tropical depression (≤38 mph, ≤62 km/h) Tropical storm (39–73 mph, 63–118 km/h) Category 1 (74–95 mph, 119–153 km/h) Category 2 (96–110 mph, 154–177 km/h) Category 3 (111–129 mph, 178–208 km/h) Category 4 (130–156 mph, 209–251 km/h) Category 5 (≥157 mph, ≥252 km/h) Unknown Storm type Tropical cyclone Subtropical cyclone Extratropical cyclone, remnant low, tropical disturbance, or monsoon depression

A tropical wave exited western Africa on September 1, reaching the Lesser Antilles about a week later. The northern portion of the wave split off to develop into Hurricane Karl over the western Caribbean Sea. The southern portion of the wave crossed northern Central America and entered the Pacific Ocean on September 17. Upper level winds prevented initial development, although the system became more organized September 19 as conditions became more favorable. After a well-defined circulation developed the system organized into a tropical depression on September 20, located about 185 mi (295 km) west of the Mexican state of Jalisco. However, the National Hurricane Center (NHC) NHC did not begin advisories until a day later. A ridge over northwestern Mexico steered the depression to the north-northwest. Soon after its formation, the depression strengthened into Tropical Storm Georgette, attaining peak winds of 40 mph (65 km/h). Strong wind shear diminished the convection, although the thunderstorms increased again on September 21. Around 18:00 UTC that day, Georgette made landfall as a minimal tropical storm on the southern Baja California peninsula near San José del Cabo, with a minimum pressure of 999 mbar (29.5 inHg). Georgette weakened into a tropical depression over land, before crossing the Gulf of California. Around 22:00 UTC on September 21, the depression moved ashore San Carlos, Sonora, and the circulation dissipated the next day.

== Preparations and impact ==
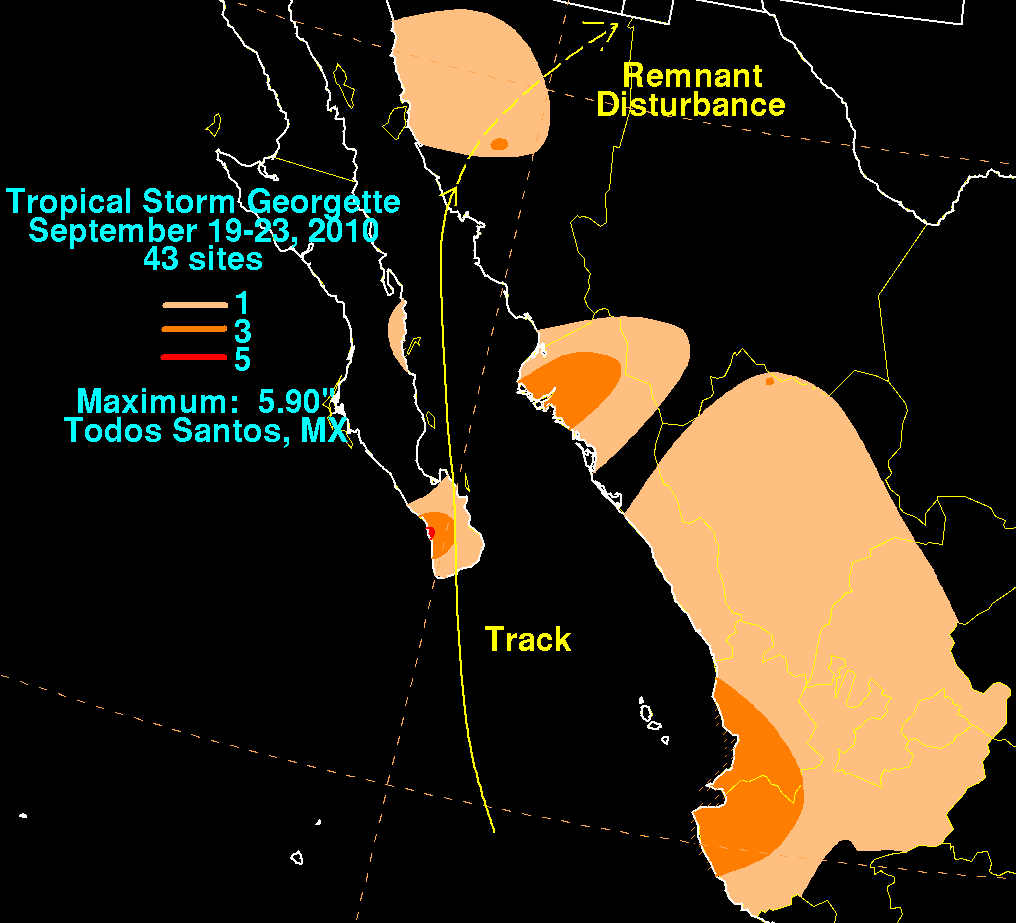
Rainfall from Georgette in western Mexico

The Mexican government issued a tropical storm warning for extreme southern Baja California Sur. Officials warned rural areas in Baja California Sur of heavy rain and high wind. Officials issued a red alert for parts of Sonora. 52 shelters were opened in the Cajeme municipality. Schools in Bahía Kino and coastal areas of the Hermosillo Municipality temporarily suspended classes.

Georgette caused the heaviest rains on Baja California Sur in the last 15 years, leaving many people homeless. Georgette also produced high waves. The tropical cyclone worsened Mexico's flooding problem which started when Hurricane Karl made landfall several days earlier. A peak rainfall total of 5.9 in (150 mm) fell in Todos Santos. Rainfall in Sonora reached 4.4 in (112 mm). Across Sonora, the rains forced about 500,000 people to evacuate. The floods damaged 220 homes. Heavy runoff caused inflows of 18,000 cu ft/s (510 m^{3}/s) into El Novillo Dam, forcing the Comisión Nacional del Agua, the local water authorities, to release water from the dam.

Moisture from the system combined with an approaching trough to produce heavy rainfall and thunderstorms across New Mexico. A total of 6.42 in (163 mm) was reported in Gladstone. The rains caused flooding that killed a person along the Rio Grande near Carnuel. Total damage in New Mexico totaled to US$12,000. Moisture from the system also caused flooding in Arizona. 2.25 inches of rain fell in 45 minutes. Numerous roads were washed out, causing several vehicles to be damaged by floodwaters. Damaged totaled to US$50,000. In Texas, flash flooding caused US$10,000 in damage.

== See also ==
- Other storms of the same name
- 2010 Pacific hurricane season
- List of tropical cyclone names
