= 1992 Pacific hurricane season =

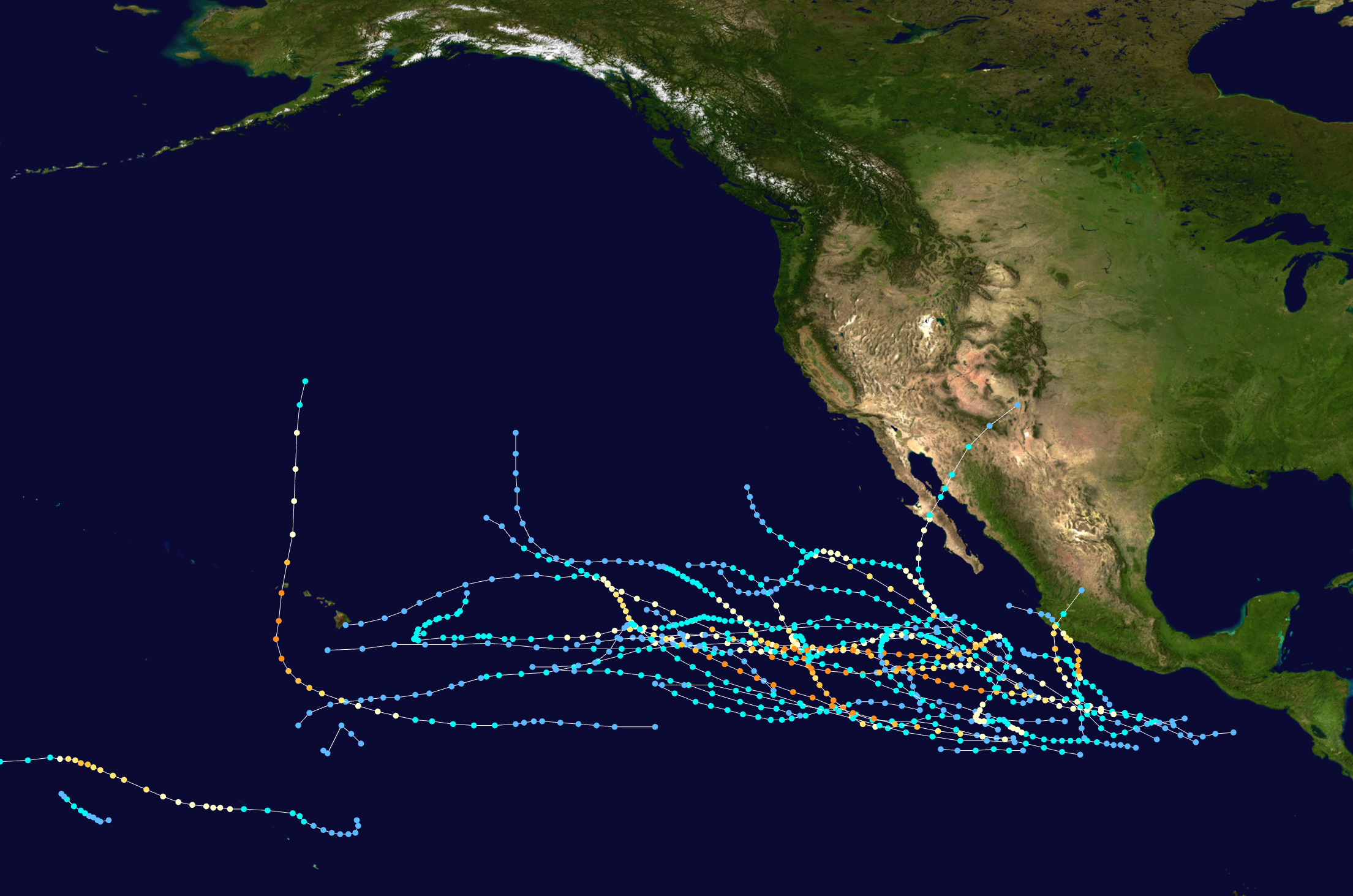
- Season summary map

Seasonal boundaries
- First system formed: January 28, 1992
- Last system dissipated: November 23, 1992

Strongest storm
- Name: Tina
  - Maximum winds: 150 mph (240 km/h) (1-minute sustained)
  - Lowest pressure: 932 mbar (hPa; 27.52 inHg)

Seasonal statistics
- Total depressions: 30
- Total storms: 27 (record high)
- Hurricanes: 16 (record high, tied with 1990, 2014, and 2015)
- Major hurricanes (Cat. 3+): 10
- Total fatalities: 25 total
- Total damage: ≥ $3.15 billion (1992 USD) (Third-costliest Pacific hurricane season on record)

Related articles
- Timeline of the 1992 Pacific hurricane season; 1992 Atlantic hurricane season; 1992 Pacific typhoon season; 1992 North Indian Ocean cyclone season

The 1992 Pacific hurricane season was the most active Pacific hurricane season on record, featuring 27 named storms. The season also produced the third-highest ACE value on record in the basin, only surpassed by the 2018 and 2026 seasons. The 1992 season officially started on May 15 in the eastern Pacific, and on June 1 in the central Pacific, and lasted until November 30. These dates conventionally delimit the period of each year when most tropical cyclones form in the northeastern Pacific Ocean. However, tropical cyclogenesis is possible at any time of the year, as demonstrated by the development of Hurricane Ekeka on January 28, and Tropical Storm Hali two months later.

The most notable storm was Hurricane Iniki, which caused billions of dollars of damage to the Hawaiian Islands, primarily in Kauai, along with six fatalities. Hurricanes Lester, Virgil, Winifred, and Orlene also made landfall, but were significantly less destructive. Hurricane Darby and Tropical Storm Agatha brought rains and more destruction to Mexico, without making landfall. Hurricane Tina was, in addition to being the strongest storm of the year, the longest-lasting Pacific hurricane at the time.

== Season summary ==
Most intense Pacific hurricane seasons
Rank	Season	ACE value
1	2026	359.2
2	2018	318.1
3	1992	294.6
4	2015	290.6
5	1990	249.5
6	1978	207.7
7	1983	206.2
8	2014	202.4
9	1993	201.8
10	1984	193.7

The Accumulated Cyclone Energy (ACE) index for the 1992 Pacific hurricane season (Eastern Pacific and Central Pacific combined) as calculated by Colorado State University using data from the National Hurricane Center was 294.3 units, the third highest value on record for a Northeastern Pacific season. The total represents the sum of the squares of the maximum sustained wind speed (knots) for every (sub)tropical storm's intensity of over 33 knots (38 mph; 61 km/h), divided by 10,000 while they are above that threshold, so storms that last a long time, as well as particularly strong hurricanes, have high ACEs; calculations are not made for tropical depressions.

Warmer than usual sea surface temperatures due to an El Niño fostered the high level of tropical activity during the year. The season officially started on May 15, 1992, in the eastern Pacific, and on June 1, 1992, in the central Pacific. It ended in both basins on November 30, 1992.

During the season, twenty-seven tropical cyclones formed in the Eastern Pacific (east of longitude 140°W), and twenty-four developed further and became tropical storms. Both of these figures constitute records in the basin, as the 1992 season surpassed the season with the most tropical cyclones (1982, 26) and the season with the most named storms (1985, 22). Of these, fourteen reached hurricane strength and eight became major hurricanes—storms that reach Category 3 or higher on the Saffir-Simpson Hurricane Scale.

List of costliest Pacific hurricane seasons
Rank	Cost	Season
1	≥$13.1 billion	2023
2	$4.47 billion	2013
3	≥$3.15 billion	1992
4	$2.46 billion	2024
5	≥$2.09 billion	2014
6	≥$1.64 billion	2018
7	$1.62 billion	2010
8	$1.31 billion	1982
10	$918.15 million	2026
10	$850 million	1998

This season had five storms reach tropical storm intensity or higher in the month of October, the first time on record that this had happened in this basin. In addition, Hurricanes or Tropical Storms Winifred through Zeke are the earliest twenty-first through twenty-fourth named storms in a season in the eastern north Pacific.

The Central Pacific (between 140°W and the International Date Line) saw similarly high levels of activity. Eleven tropical cyclones were tracked by the Central Pacific Hurricane Center (CPHC) throughout the hurricane season. Of those, eight developed in the Eastern Pacific and crossed into the Central Pacific, and three formed within the basin. Two of the storms strengthened to major hurricane status within the Central Pacific's boundaries.

The first storm of the season, Ekeka, formed on January 26, and was the first recorded January central Pacific hurricane. Later in the season, Iniki, crossed into the basin as a tropical depression, strengthened to a Category 4 hurricane, and made landfall in Hawaii, becoming the most destructive hurricane in the state's history.

== Systems ==
=== Hurricane Ekeka ===
- Category 3 hurricane (SSHWS)
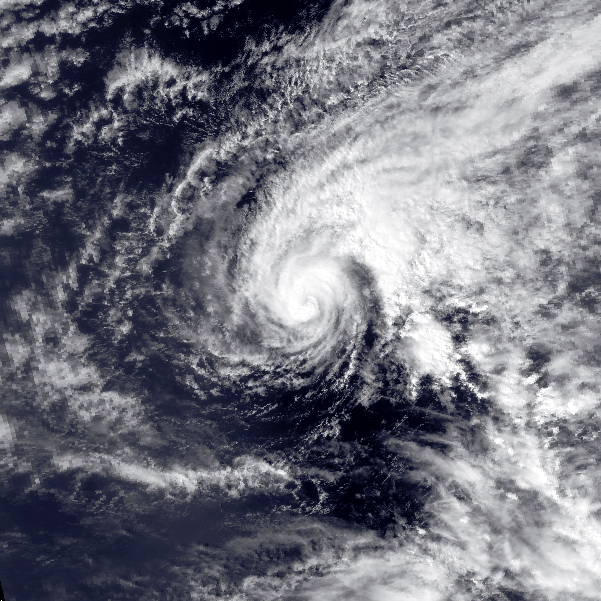
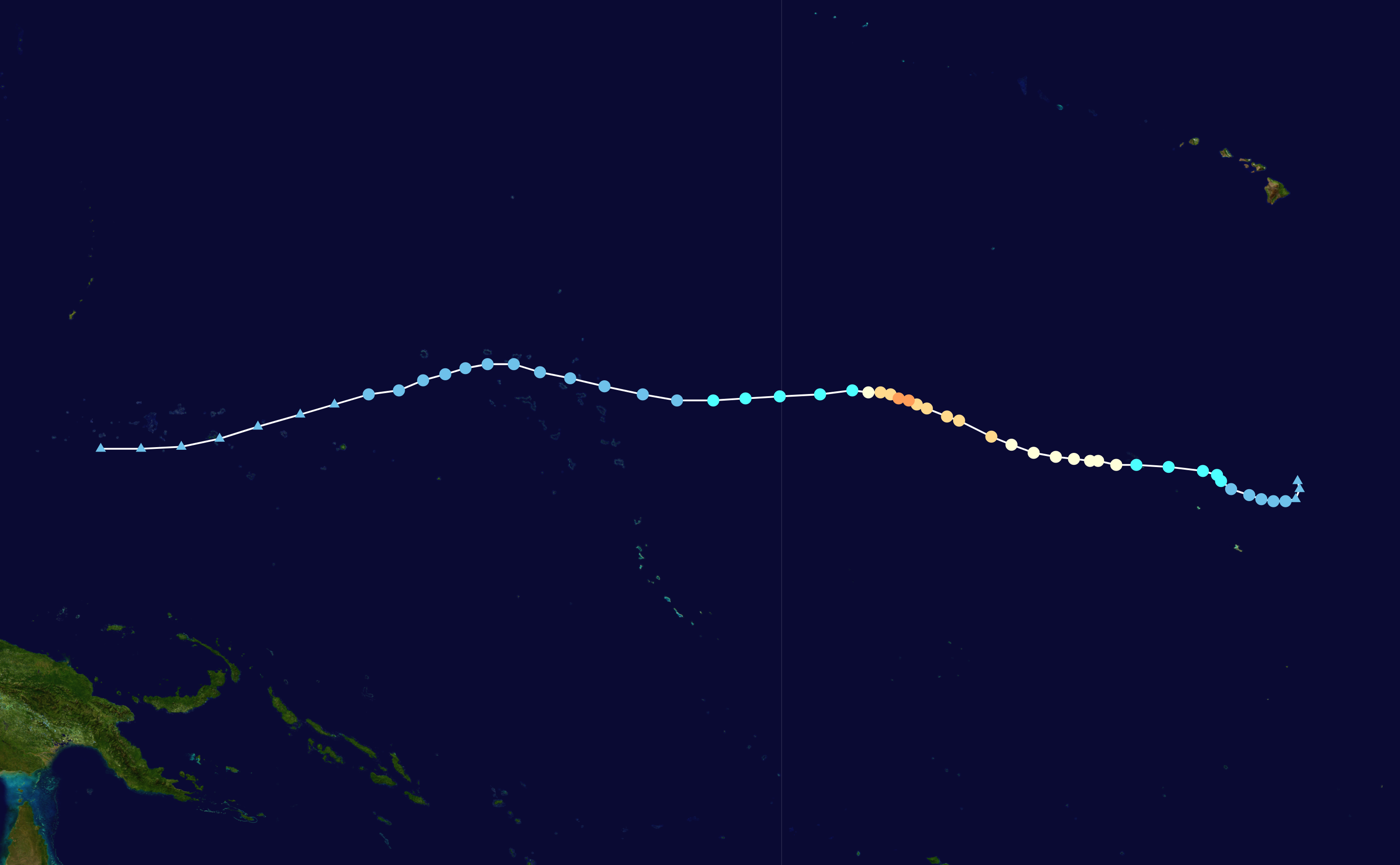
- Duration: January 28 – February 3 (Exited basin)
- Peak intensity: 115 mph (185 km/h) (1-min); ≥982 mbar (hPa)

Toward the end of January, the monsoon trough extended across the equator into the central north Pacific, producing an area of convection, or thunderstorms, over warm waters and low wind shear. By January 23, several ships reported squalls and strong southwesterly winds in the region. The disturbance organized further as it tracked westward, and on January 28 it developed into Tropical Depression One-C, located a short distance north of Kiritimati and east of Tabuaeran. Its formation was unusual, since the system was located well to the south of the area of normal tropical cyclone formation, further south than any other Pacific hurricane at the time, and the formation occurred well outside the climatological bounds of the hurricane season. Soon after its formation, the depression strengthened into Tropical Storm Ekeka. With favorable conditions, the storm continued strengthening as it moved generally westward. Ekeka attained hurricane status on January 30, about 100 miles (160 km) northwest of Palmyra Atoll. It became one of only three tropical cyclones on record to be located within the Palmyra Atoll Exclusive Economic Zone, and the only hurricane. On February 2, Ekeka attained peak winds of 115 mph (185 km/h), making it a major hurricane, or Category 3 hurricane on the Saffir–Simpson scale. Shortly thereafter, wind shear increased due to a large trough in the Westerlies. This caused Ekeka to weaken gradually. Its forward motion increased as the subtropical ridge strengthened to the north of the hurricane. Ekeka to a tropical storm early on February 3, and later that day, it crossed the International Date Line into the western Pacific Ocean. Shortly thereafter, Ekeka weakened to tropical depression status. Ekeka later passed through the Marshall Islands before dissipating on February 9 to the north of Papua New Guinea.

=== Tropical Storm Hali ===
- Tropical storm (SSHWS)
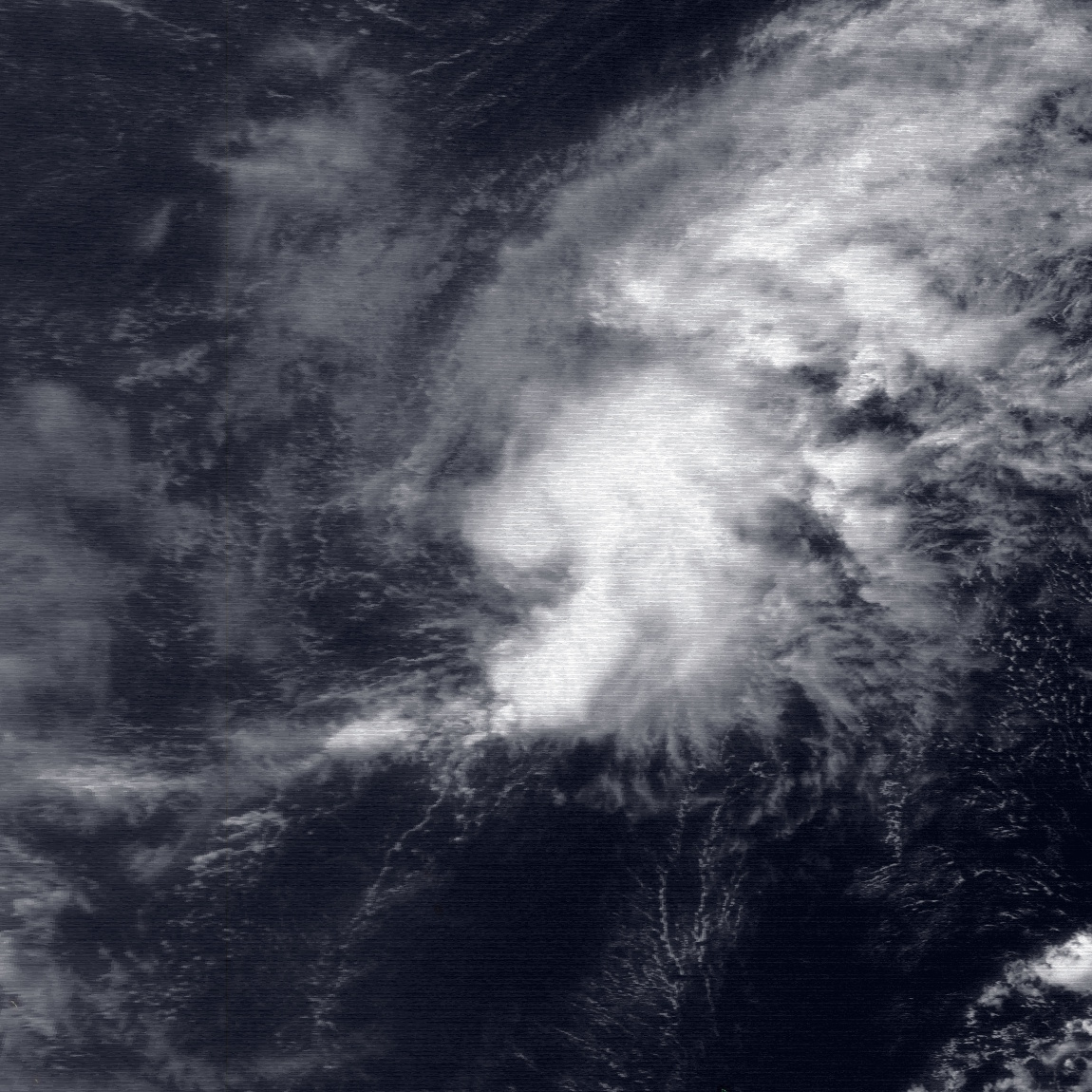
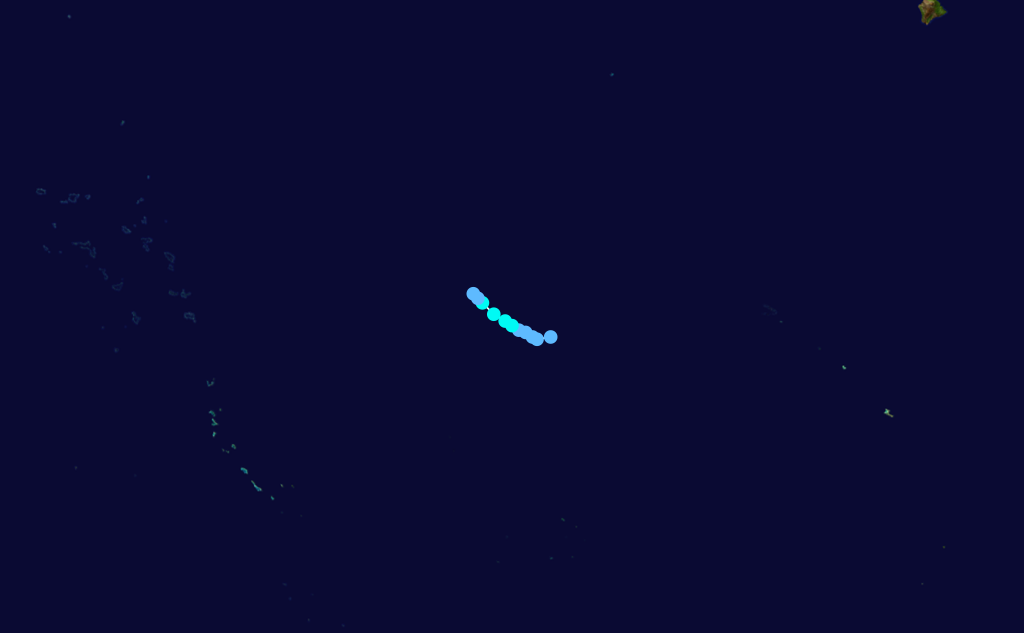
- Duration: March 28 – March 30
- Peak intensity: 50 mph (85 km/h) (1-min); 1005 mbar (hPa)

In late March, meteorological conditions similar to what allowed Ekeka to develop persisted in the central Pacific. An area of convection organized into Tropical Depression Two-C, just north of 5˚N, atypically close to the equator, and far to the southwest of Hawaii. Moving west-northwestward, it slowly intensified, intensifying into a tropical storm on March 29. Upon doing so, the CPHC gave it the name Hali. Later that day, the storm attained peak winds of 50 mph (80 km/h), before increased southwesterly wind shear imparted weakening. Hali was downgraded to a tropical depression on March 30, and it dissipated shortly thereafter.

=== Tropical Storm Agatha ===
- Tropical storm (SSHWS)
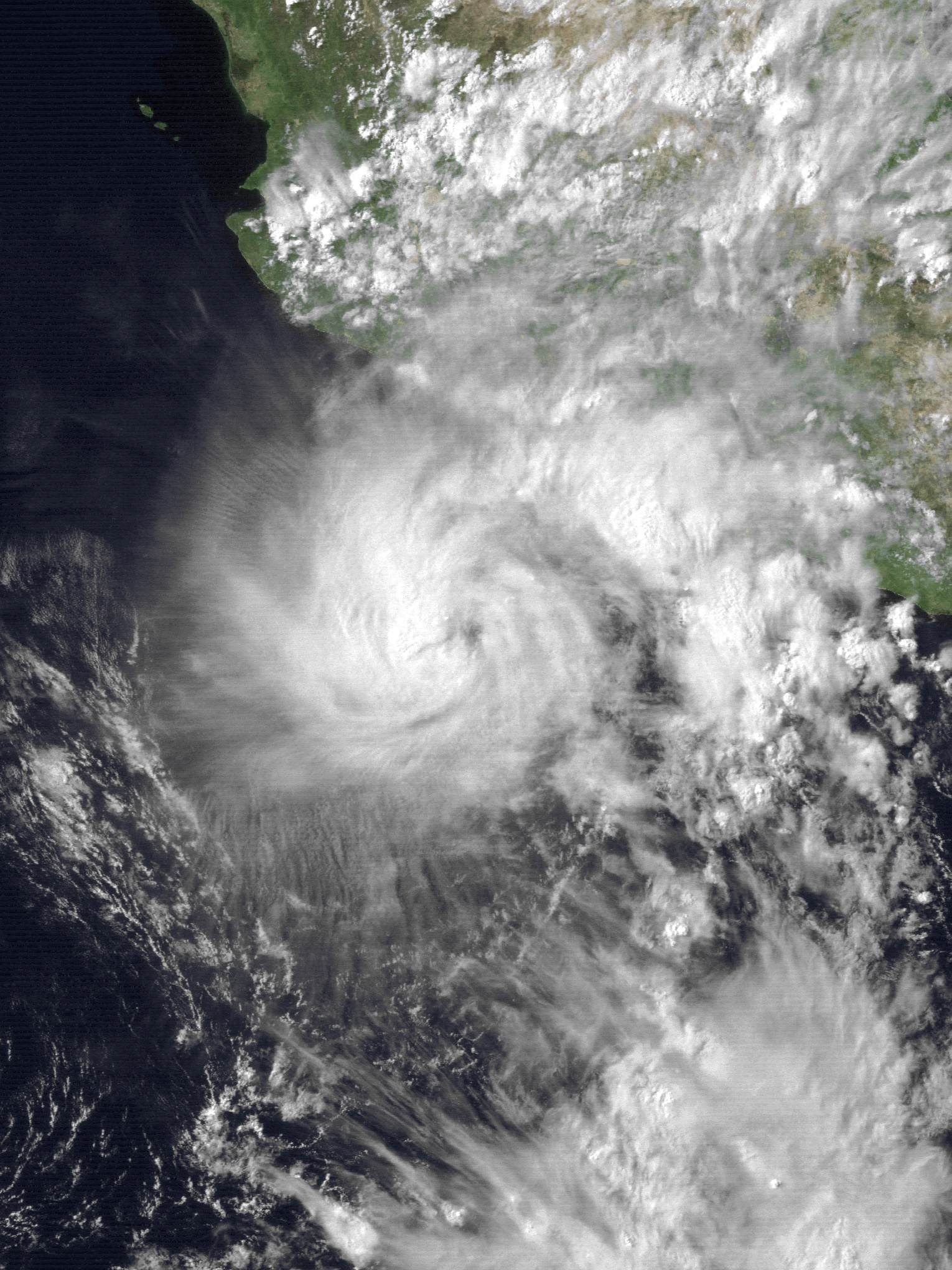
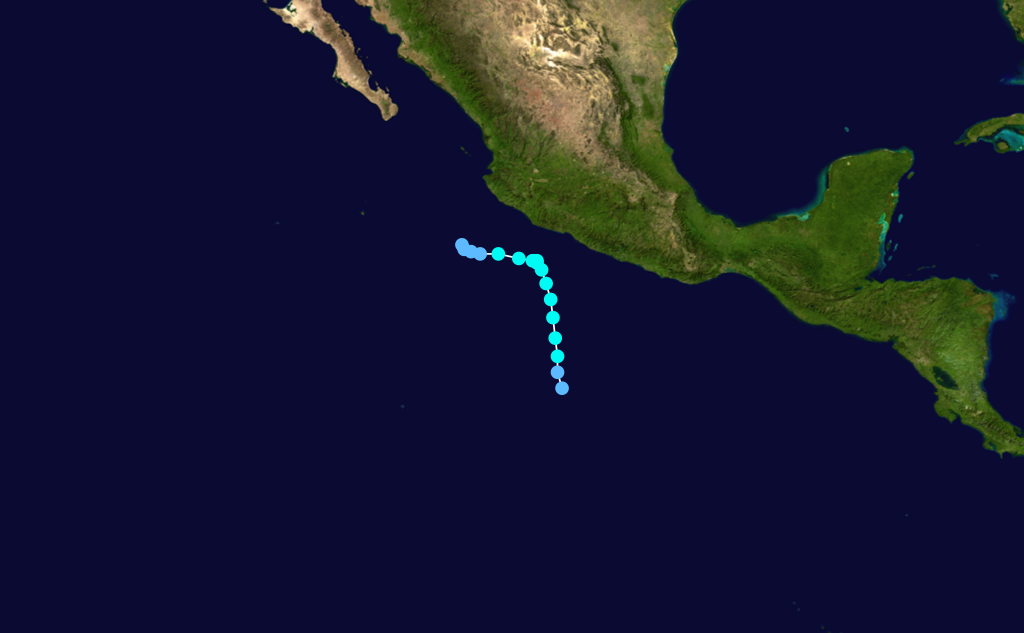
- Duration: June 1 – June 5
- Peak intensity: 70 mph (110 km/h) (1-min); 990 mbar (hPa)

On May 26, a tropical wave moved off the Central America, which began to show signs of organization on May 29. Early on June 1, the NHC classified it as a tropical depression while located 460 mi (740 km) southwest of Acapulco. Based on a combination of ship data and Dvorak intensity estimates, the system was upgraded into Tropical Storm Agatha on June 2. Agatha steered toward the north while steadily intensifying. Around 1800 UTC June 2, the storm peaked in intensity with winds of 70 mph (110 km/h) and a minimum pressure of 990 mbar (990 hPa; 29 inHg). Maintaining its peak intensity for 30 hours, Agatha gradually decelerated as it passed within 100 mi (160 km) southwest of the Mexican coast. The center of the storm promptly became less defined on June 3, simultaneously recurving to the west. By 06:00 UTC June 5, the storm was downgraded back into tropical depression status prior to dissipating the next day.

On June 2, forecasters at the National Hurricane Center anticipated Agatha to make landfall in Mexico near hurricane strength. In light of this, a tropical storm warning and hurricane watch were issued for the Pacific coast of Mexico between Tenexpa to Cabo Corrites around 2100 UTC that day. Additionally, heavy rains from the system prompted concerns over mudslides and flash floods. Following Agatha's turn towards the west early on June 3, the watches and warnings were discontinued. Roughly 1,500 people evacuated from coastal areas of Michoacán due to the threat of damaging winds and flooding. Although the center of Agatha remained offshore, heavy rains within the system's outer rainbands impacted southwestern and central Mexico. Widespread flooding and mudslides killed ten people and left thousands homeless. Along the coast, waves reportedly reached heights of 16 ft (4.9 m).

=== Tropical Storm Blas ===
- Tropical storm (SSHWS)
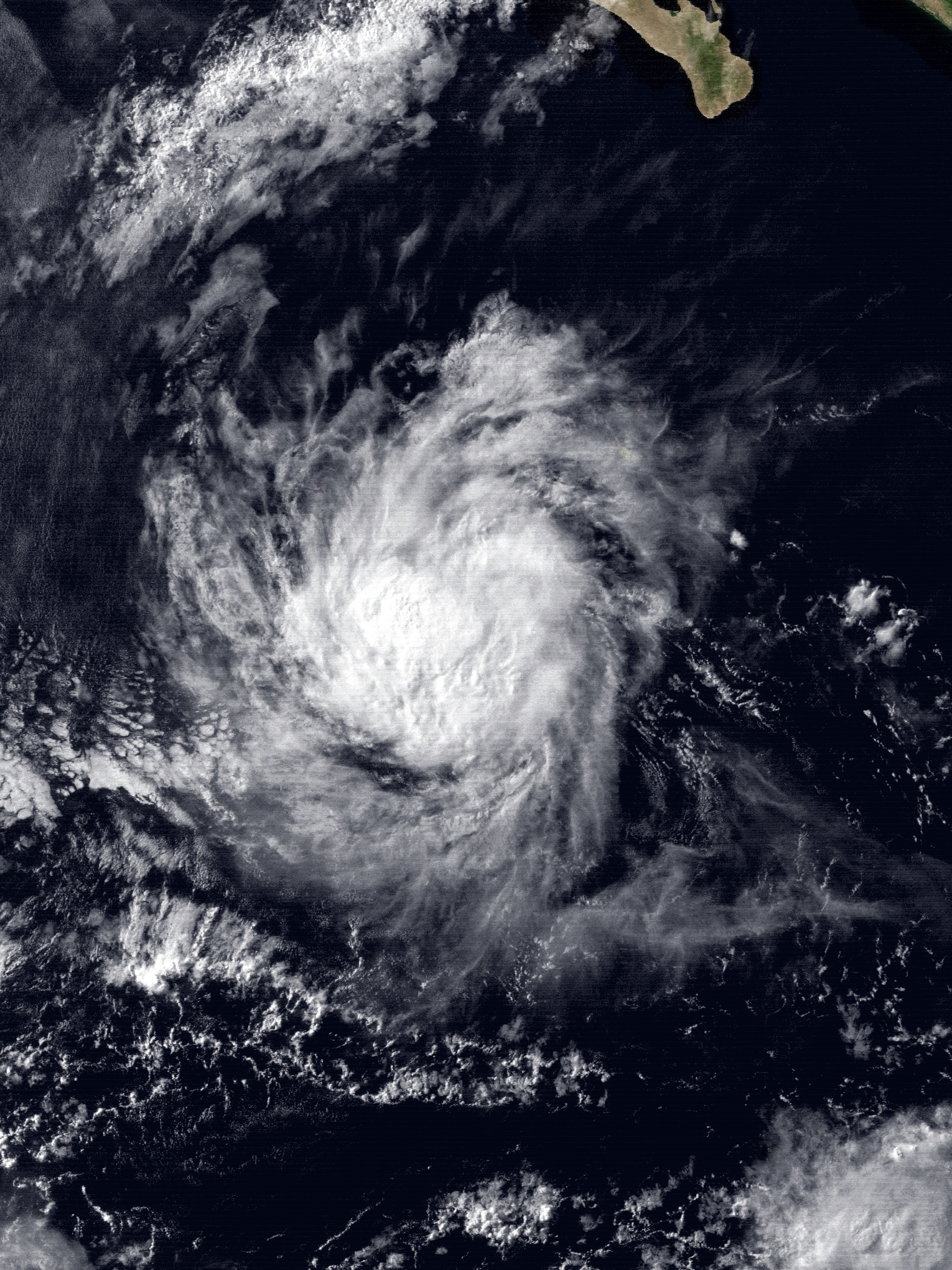
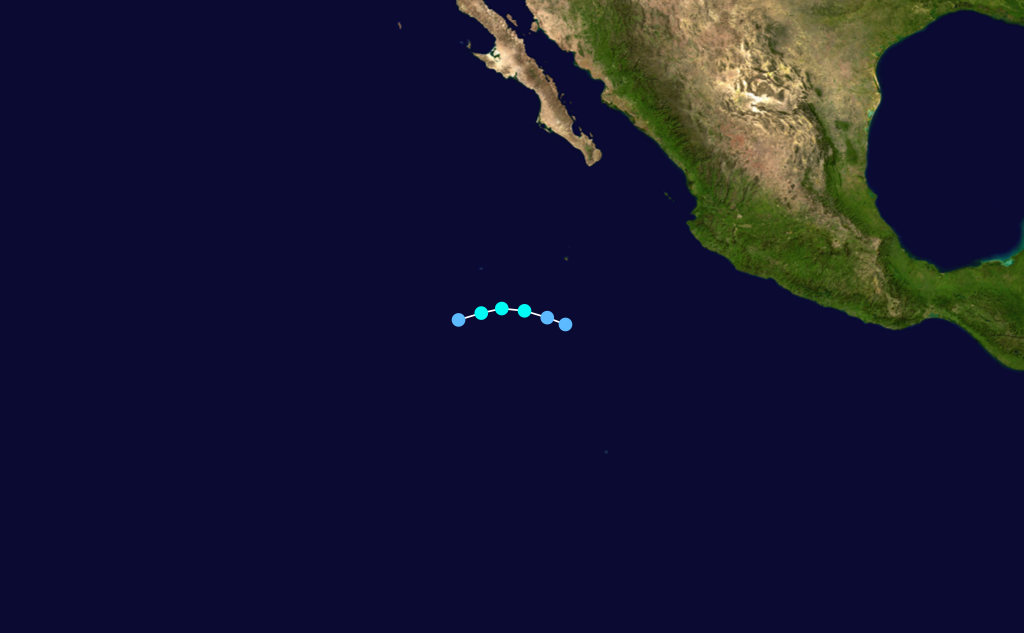
- Duration: June 22 – June 24
- Peak intensity: 40 mph (65 km/h) (1-min); 1004 mbar (hPa)

A tropical wave crossed Central America from June 14–16. The system entered the Eastern Pacific. On June 22, The tropical wave organized into the fourth depression of the season, 460 mi (740 km) south of the Baja California Peninsula. Early on June 23, the depression intensified into Tropical Storm Blas. However, later that day, Blas weakened back to a depression, and dissipated at 00:00 UTC June 24.

=== Hurricane Celia ===
- Category 4 hurricane (SSHWS)
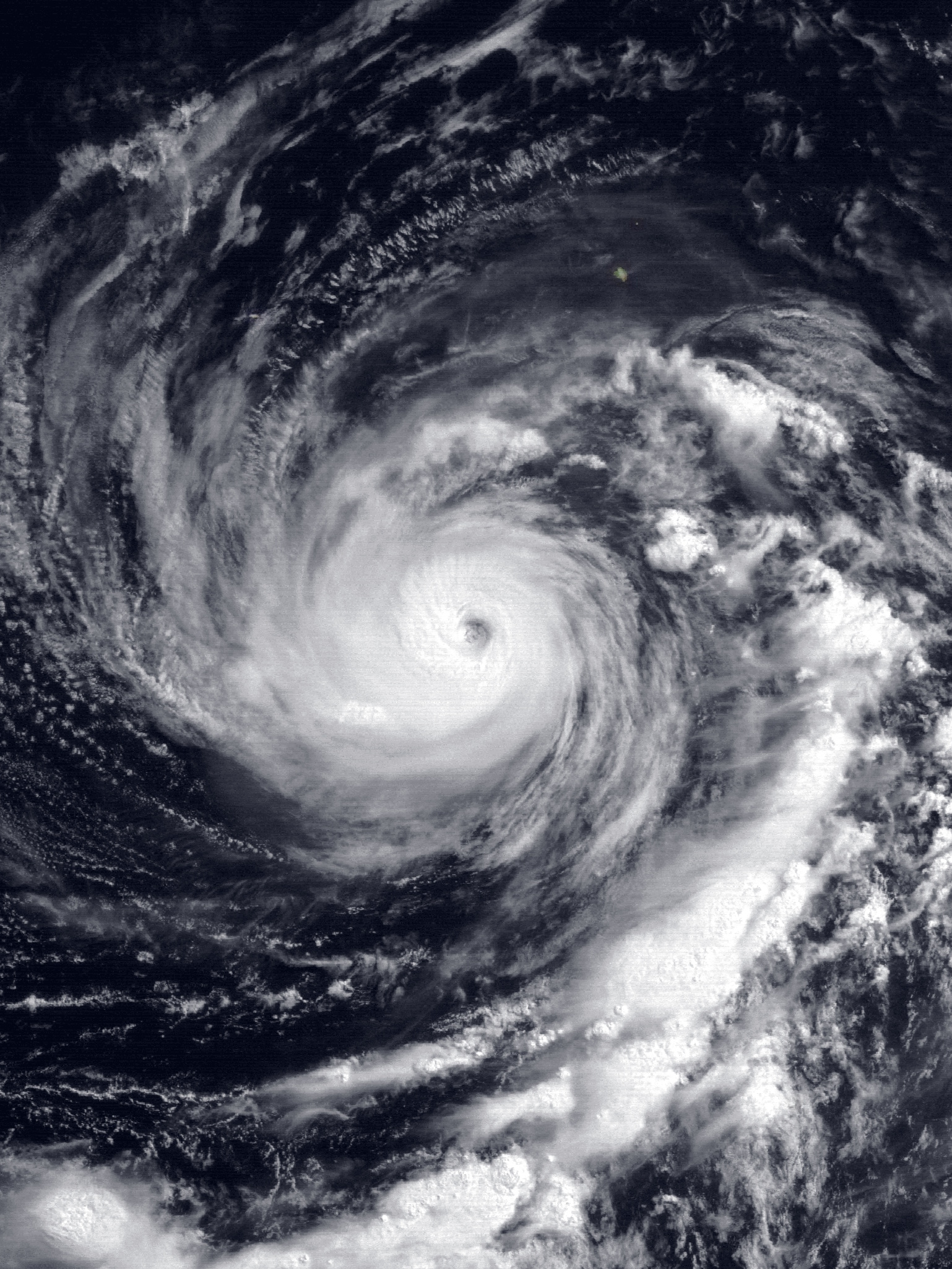
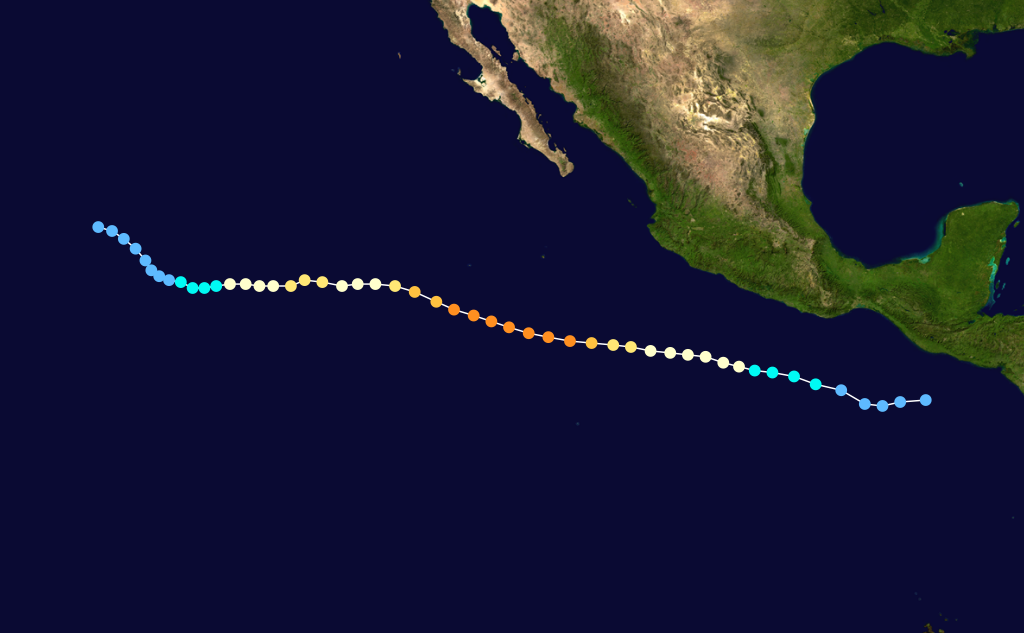
- Duration: June 22 – July 4
- Peak intensity: 145 mph (230 km/h) (1-min); 935 mbar (hPa)

Celia formed from tropical wave that crossed over into the East Pacific basin around June 19. The system was classified as a tropical depression while located 170 mi (270 km) west of Guatemala. The storm intensified into Tropical Storm Celia on June 23. The next day, Celia was upgraded into a hurricane. Celia's rate of intensification accelerated. By June 26, Celia intensified into a Category 2 hurricane. The storm was then upgraded to a Category 3 hurricane later that day. Early on June 27, Celia became a Category 4 major hurricane with winds of 145 mph (233 km/h) and a minimal pressure of 935 mbar (27.6 inHg). Celia maintained this intensity for about 24 hours and then started to gradually weaken. Late on June 28, the storm fluctuated in intensity over the next several days. On June 29, Celia weakened to a Category 1 hurricane. The system briefly re-intensified into a Category 2 hurricane, but later continued weakening. Celia fell below hurricane status on July 2. Turing northwest, the tropical cyclone weakened back to tropical depression status the next day. Thereafter, Celia dissipated July 4.

=== Hurricane Darby ===
- Category 3 hurricane (SSHWS)
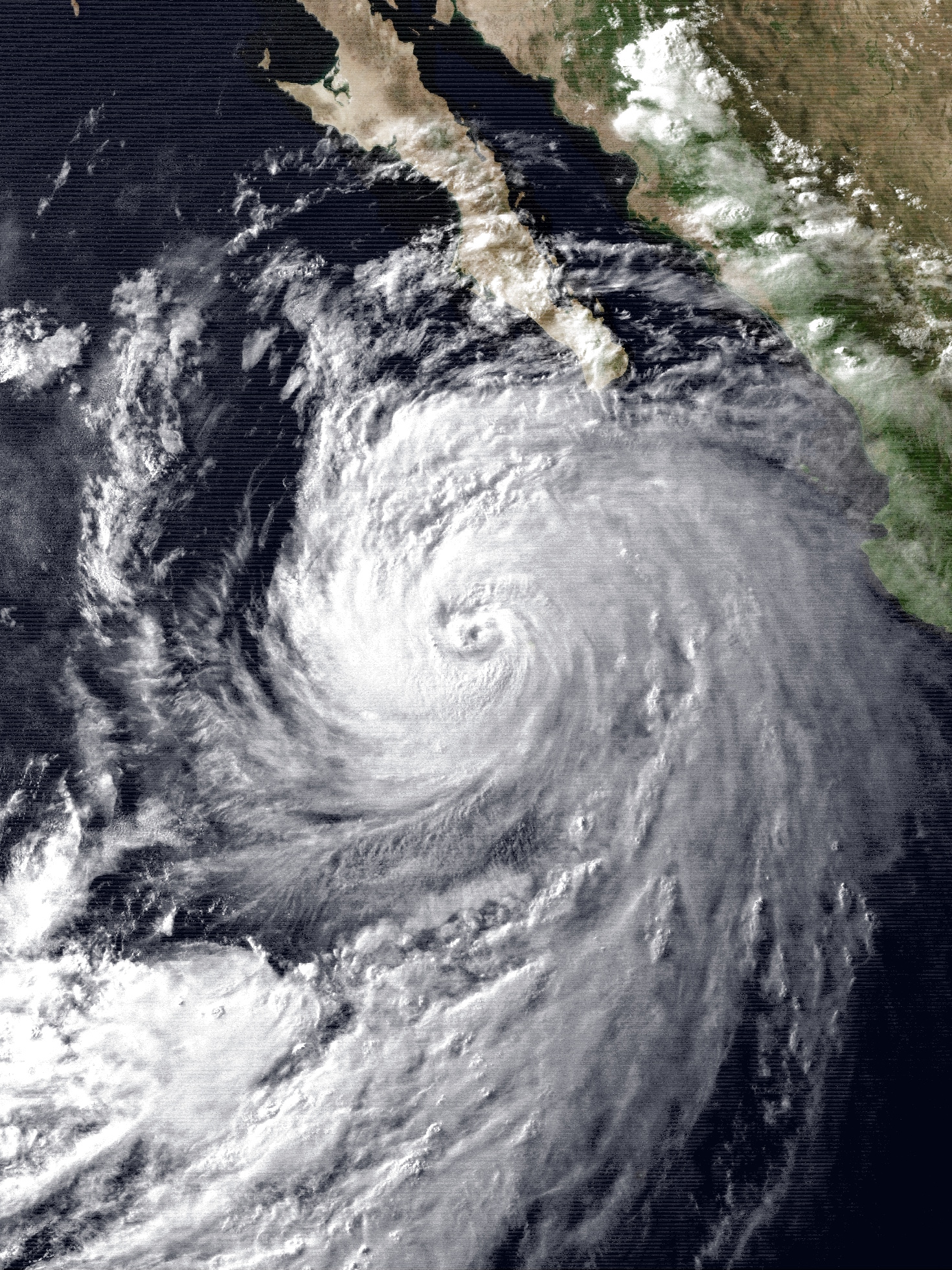
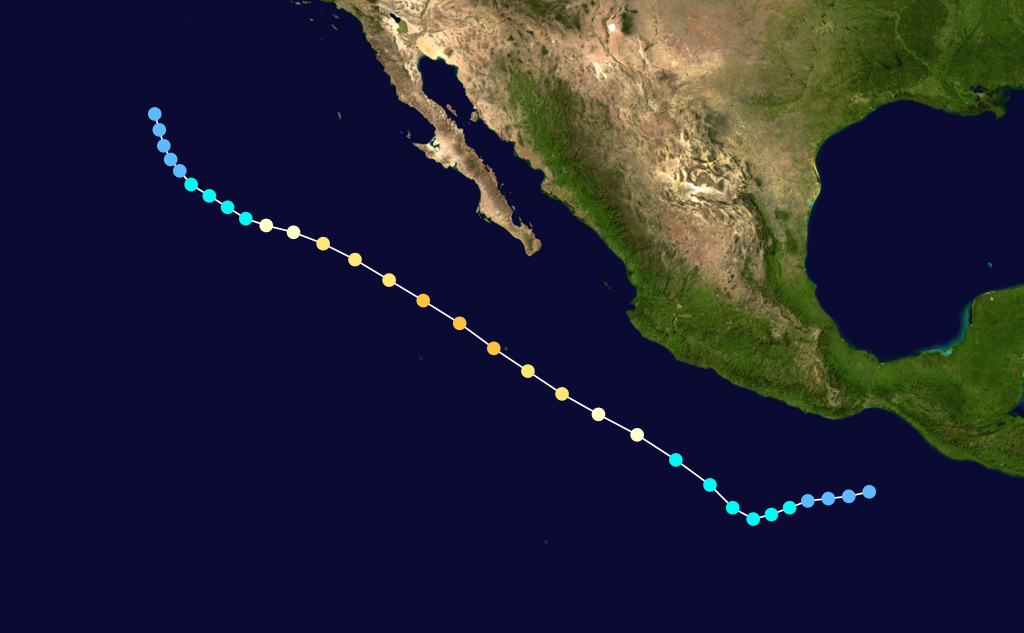
- Duration: July 2 – July 10
- Peak intensity: 120 mph (195 km/h) (1-min); 968 mbar (hPa)

A tropical wave exited Africa on June 19 and crossed into the eastern Pacific ten days later. Slowly organizing, it developed into Tropical Depression 5-E on July 2 to the south of the Gulf of Tehuantepec. Moving to the west-southwest, it strengthened into Tropical Storm Darby on July 4. The storm paralleled the coast of Mexico, and Darby strengthened into a hurricane on July 5 while also substantially increasing in size. Darby peaked as a strong Category 3 on July 6, with peak winds of 120 mph (195 km/h), and a minimum pressure of 968 mbar. Around that time, it was passing southwest of the southern tip of the Baja California peninsula. As Darby moved over cooler waters, deep convection decreased, and it was downgraded to a tropical storm on July 7. Darby was downgraded to a tropical depression on July 9, and a day later it no longer had tropical characteristics. The low continued to the northwest, passing southwest of southern California on July 14.

During Darby's formation, flooding from the cyclone's rainbands killed three people in Acapulco, where 180 shops were damaged. Four fishermen were reported missing, their fate unknown. Manzanillo, Colima, reported sustained winds just above tropical-storm force. The hurricane's remnants brought mainly light rain to the U.S. state of California, setting daily rainfall records. Cloud cover also delayed the landing of the Space Shuttle Columbia for one day. South-facing beaches of that state were pounded with waves up to 7 feet (2.1 m) in height. Darby also caused a few shipping accidents. A pleasure craft, the Oasis, had an engine failure and was abandoned. The seven people aboard were rescued, but the boat was sunk. A smaller sailboat, the Hosanna, had difficulties but was towed to a safe location by a cutter from the United States Coast Guard. A fishing boat at an unspecified location also experienced difficulties.

=== Hurricane Estelle ===
- Category 4 hurricane (SSHWS)
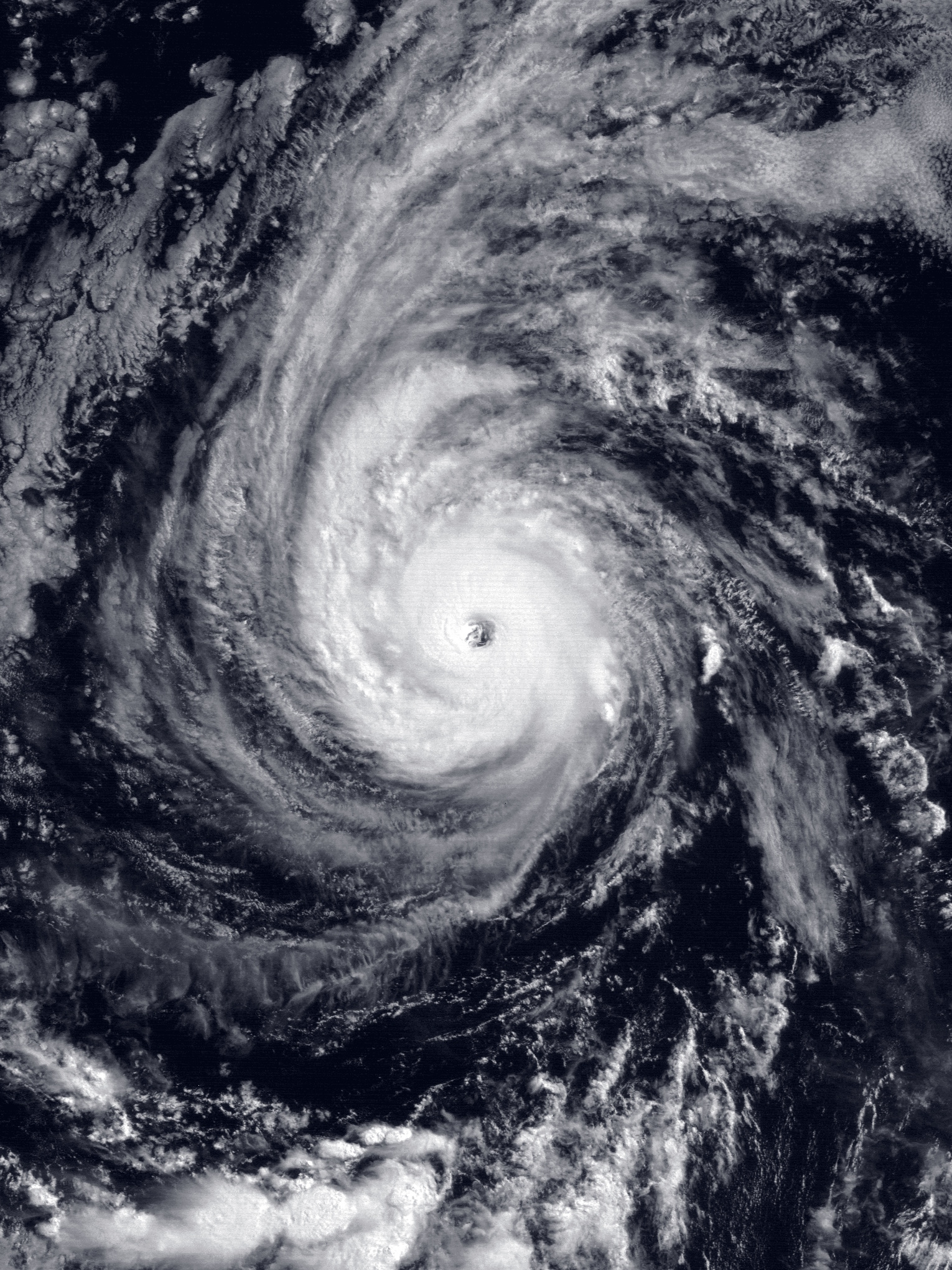
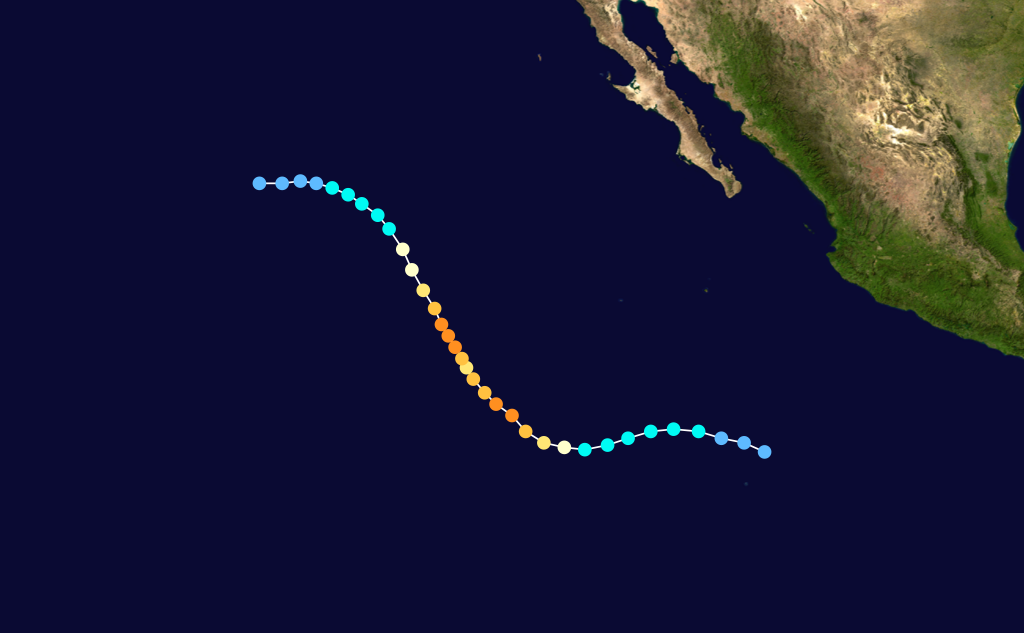
- Duration: July 9 – July 17
- Peak intensity: 140 mph (220 km/h) (1-min); 943 mbar (hPa)

The origins of Hurricane Estelle were from a tropical wave that began on June 23 off the African coast. After passing over northern South America, the wave was classified as a tropical depression. Eighteen hours later, the depression strengthened into Tropical Storm Estelle. Early on July 10, Estelle was upgraded into a hurricane. Around that time, Estelle turned to the northwest. Later that day, Estelle was upgraded to a Category 2 hurricane. On July 11, Estelle intensified into a major hurricane. A few hours later, Estelle was upgraded into a Category 4 system.

Moving northwestward, Estelle began a weakening trend. By the afternoon, Estelle was downgraded into a Category 3 system. Winds soon fell below major hurricane force, only to re-intensify back to a major hurricane hours later. Hurricane Estelle quickly re-intensified and attained its peak intensity of 140 mph (230 km/h). The storm gradually weakened over the next few days. By early on July 14, Hurricane Estelle was downgraded to a Category 3 hurricane, and shortly after, winds fell below major hurricane strength. Turning west, Estelle weakened into a tropical storm on July 15. It weakened into a tropical depression the next day. On 08:00 UTC July 17, Tropical Depression Estelle had dissipated over 1,000 mi (1,610 km) west of Baja California Sur.

=== Hurricane Frank ===
- Category 4 hurricane (SSHWS)
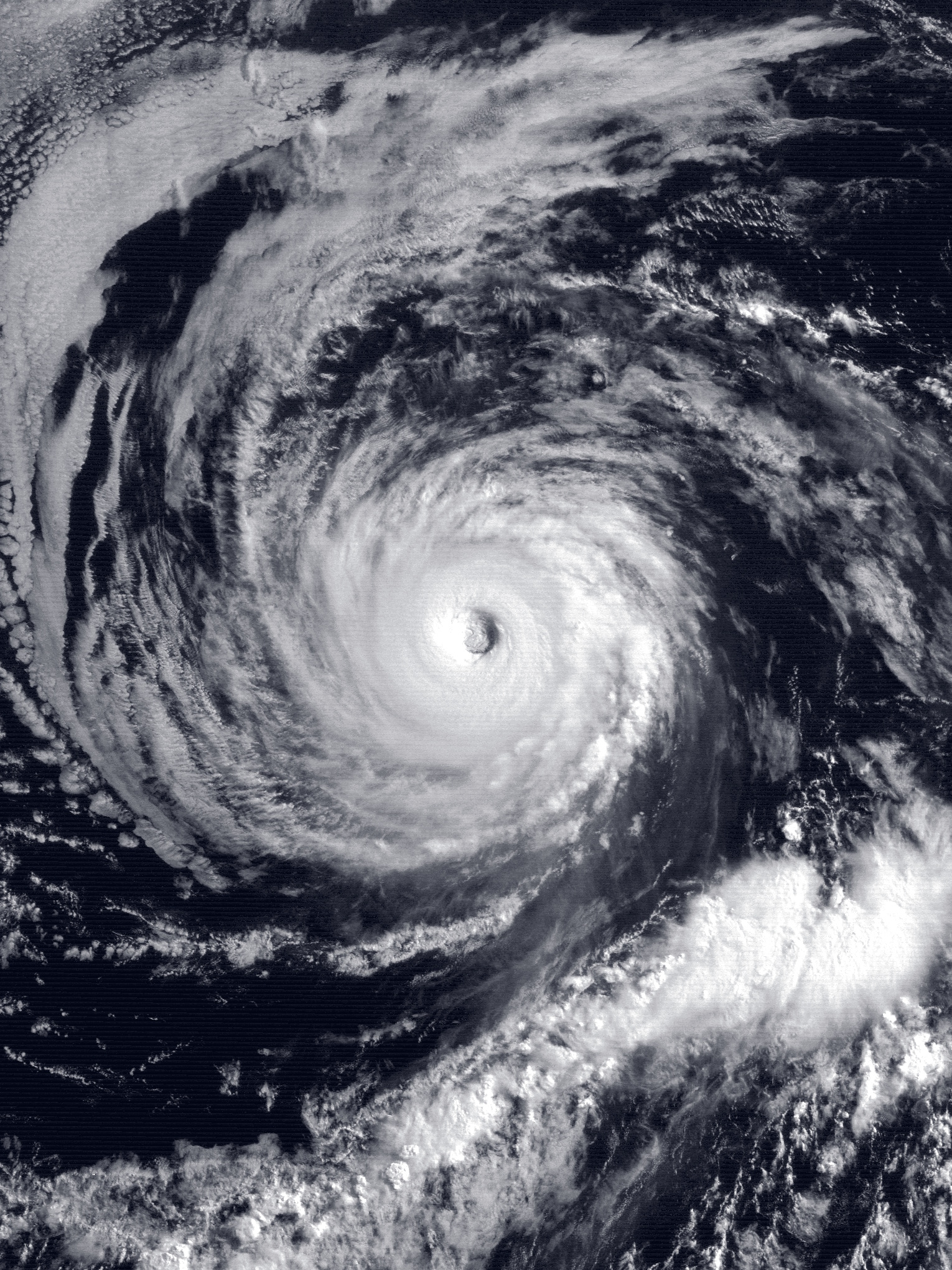
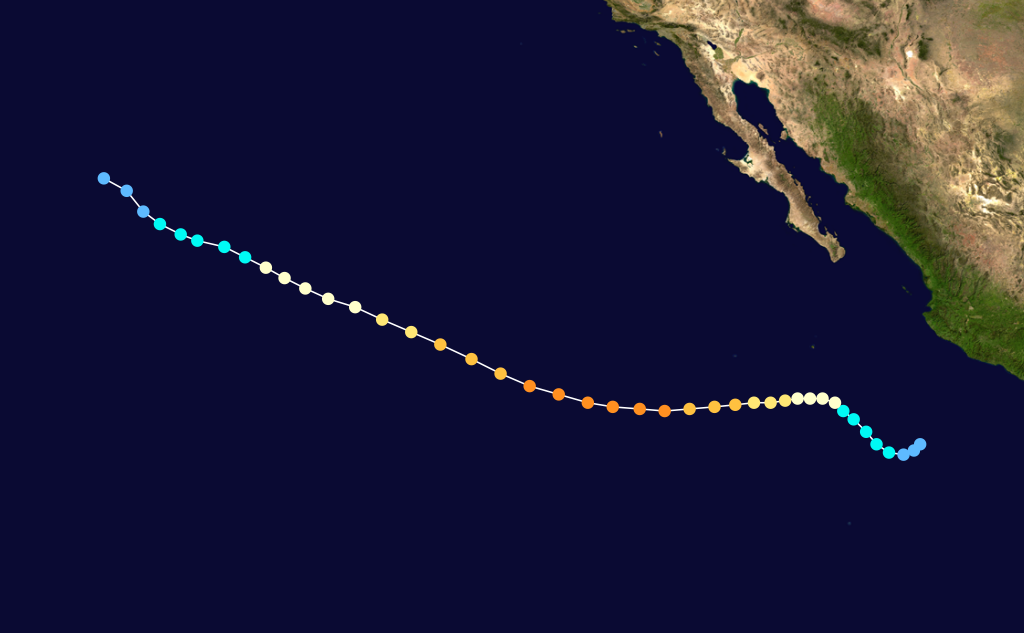
- Duration: July 13 – July 23
- Peak intensity: 145 mph (230 km/h) (1-min); 935 mbar (hPa)

The origins of Hurricane Frank were from a tropical wave that exited the coast of Africa on July 1. After reaching the Pacific, the system developed into Tropical Depression Seven-E on July 13, 660 mi (1,060 km) south-southeast of the Baja California peninsula. The depression intensified into Tropical Storm Frank on July 14. The storm tracked generally northwestward before turning to the west. The next day, Frank attained hurricane status. Late on July 15, Hurricane Frank passed about 175 mi (282 km) south of Socorro Island. A station on the island reported winds of 67 mph (108 km/h), which indicated that the hurricane had a large wind field. Slow intensification continued, and Frank intensified to a Category 3 major hurricane on July 17. On July 18, Frank reached its peak intensity of 145 mph (233 km/h) well west-southwest of the Baja California peninsula. By July 20, the storm began to weaken and fell below major hurricane intensity. On July 21, Frank was downgraded to a tropical storm. The next day, it crossed into the Central Pacific. Rapidly declining in strength, it weakened to a tropical depression on July 23. Later that day, Frank dissipated about 800 mi (1,300 km) northeast of Hawaii.

=== Hurricane Georgette ===
- Category 2 hurricane (SSHWS)
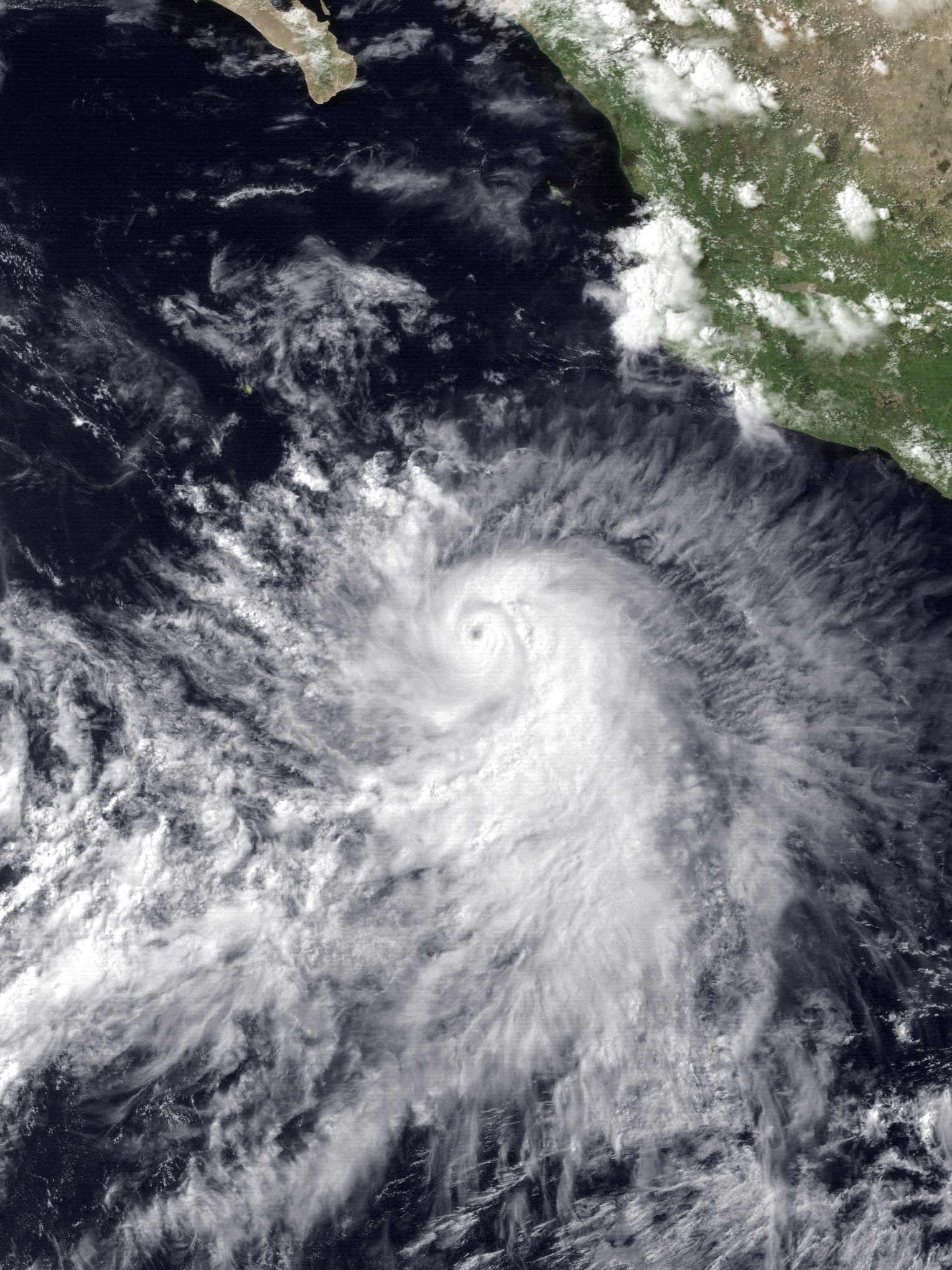
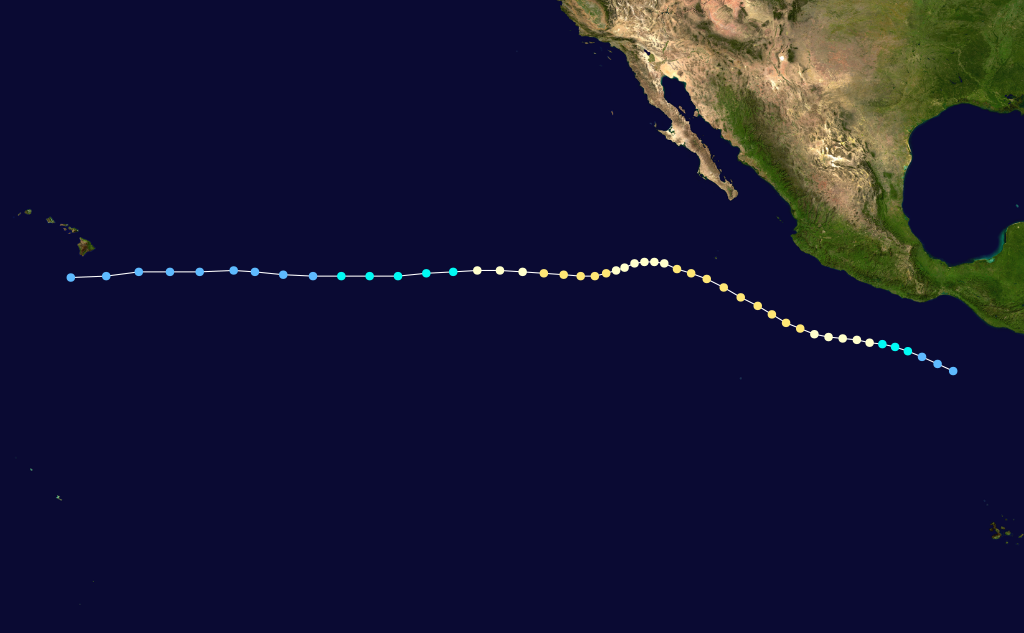
- Duration: July 14 – July 26
- Peak intensity: 110 mph (175 km/h) (1-min); 964 mbar (hPa)

A tropical wave left Africa in early July and crossed the Atlantic without development. It crossed into the eastern Pacific on July 13, and organized into Tropical Depression Eight-E on July 14. Moving west-northwest, the depression paralleled the coast of Mexico and strengthened into Tropical Storm Georgette on July 15. About 18 hours later, Georgette became a minimal hurricane. During its formative stages, Georgette brought higher than average humidity to California. The hurricane turned westward, but a west-northwest track later resumed. On July 18, Georgette reached a peak of 110 mph (180 km/h) and a minimum pressure of 964 mbar (28.5 inHg), although the NHC operationally estimated peak winds of 115 mph (185 km/h).

After wind shear increased, Georgette weakened for about two days, and on July 20 a ridge forced the hurricane southwestward. Georgette re-intensified once it turned back toward the west and it regained its peak intensity as a Category 2 hurricane on July 21. Strong upper-level winds weakened Georgette back to a tropical storm early on July 23. About 30 hours later, it weakened to a tropical depression, devoid of deep convection, and shortly thereafter entered the Central Pacific. Moving quickly westward, Georgette dissipated late on July 26, south of Hawaii.

In Hawaii, winds up to 60 mph (95 km/h) to the Big Island were reported. Several large waterspouts were sighted off of a beach in the south Kohala district. Georgette's remnants later produced squally weather at Johnston Atoll.

=== Tropical Storm Howard ===
- Tropical storm (SSHWS)
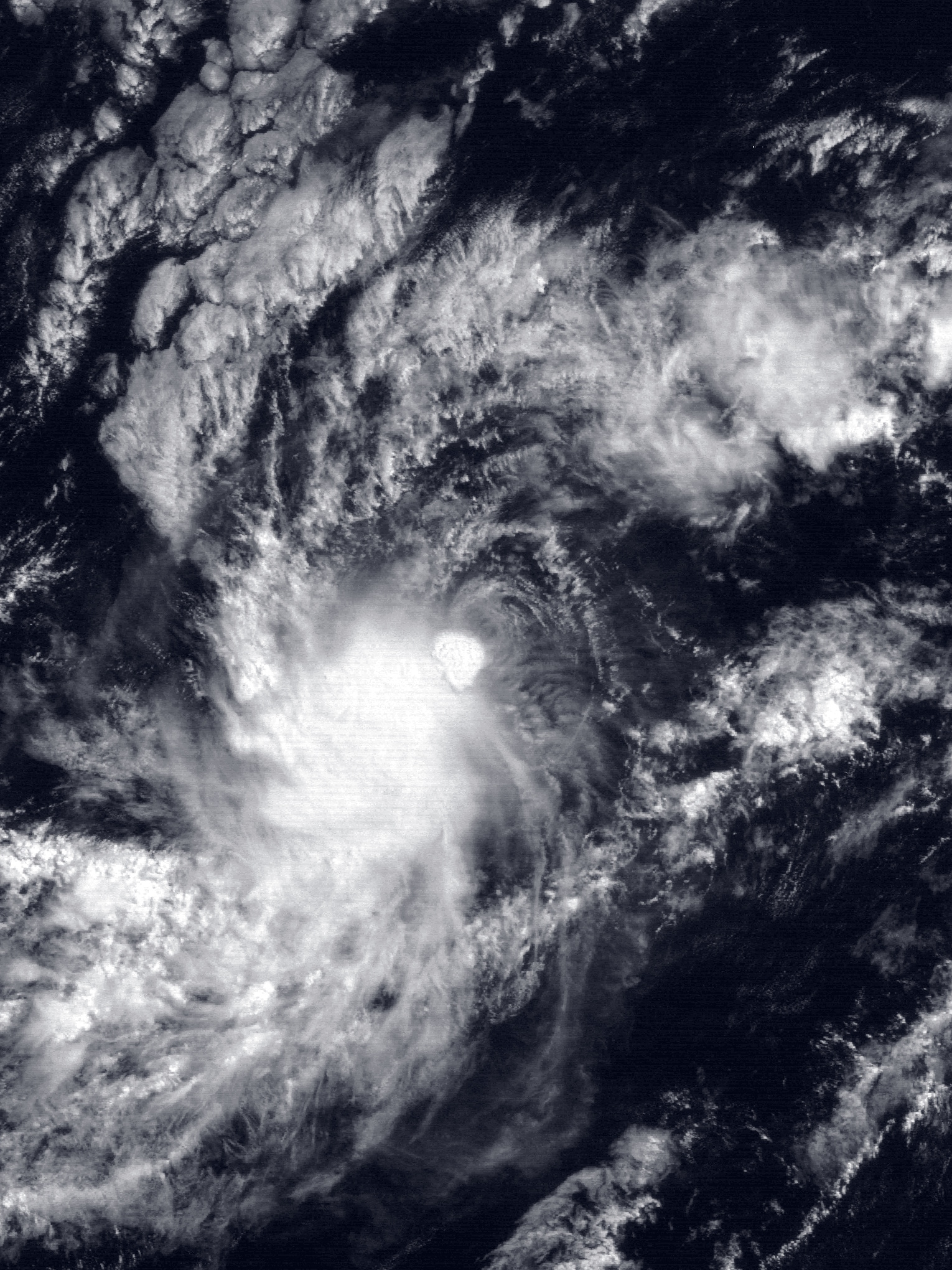
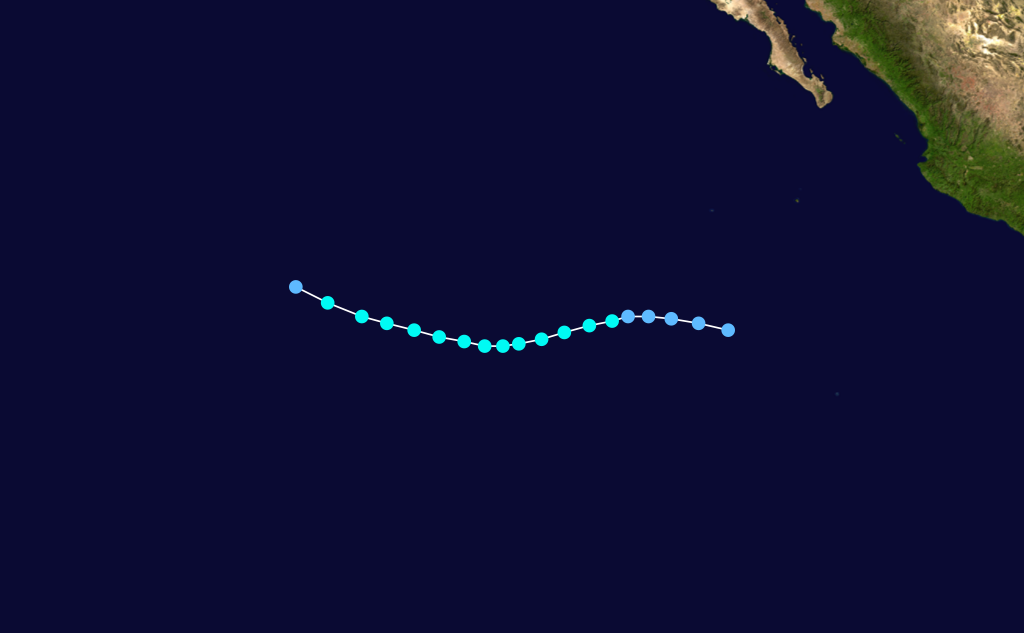
- Duration: July 26 – July 30
- Peak intensity: 65 mph (100 km/h) (1-min); 992 mbar (hPa)

On July 26 a tropical depression formed and became a weak tropical storm the next day. It steadily organized, ad reached it peak intensity as a strong tropical storm. It then began to weaken, despite being located over warm waters. Howard dissipated several days later.

=== Tropical Storm Isis ===
- Tropical storm (SSHWS)
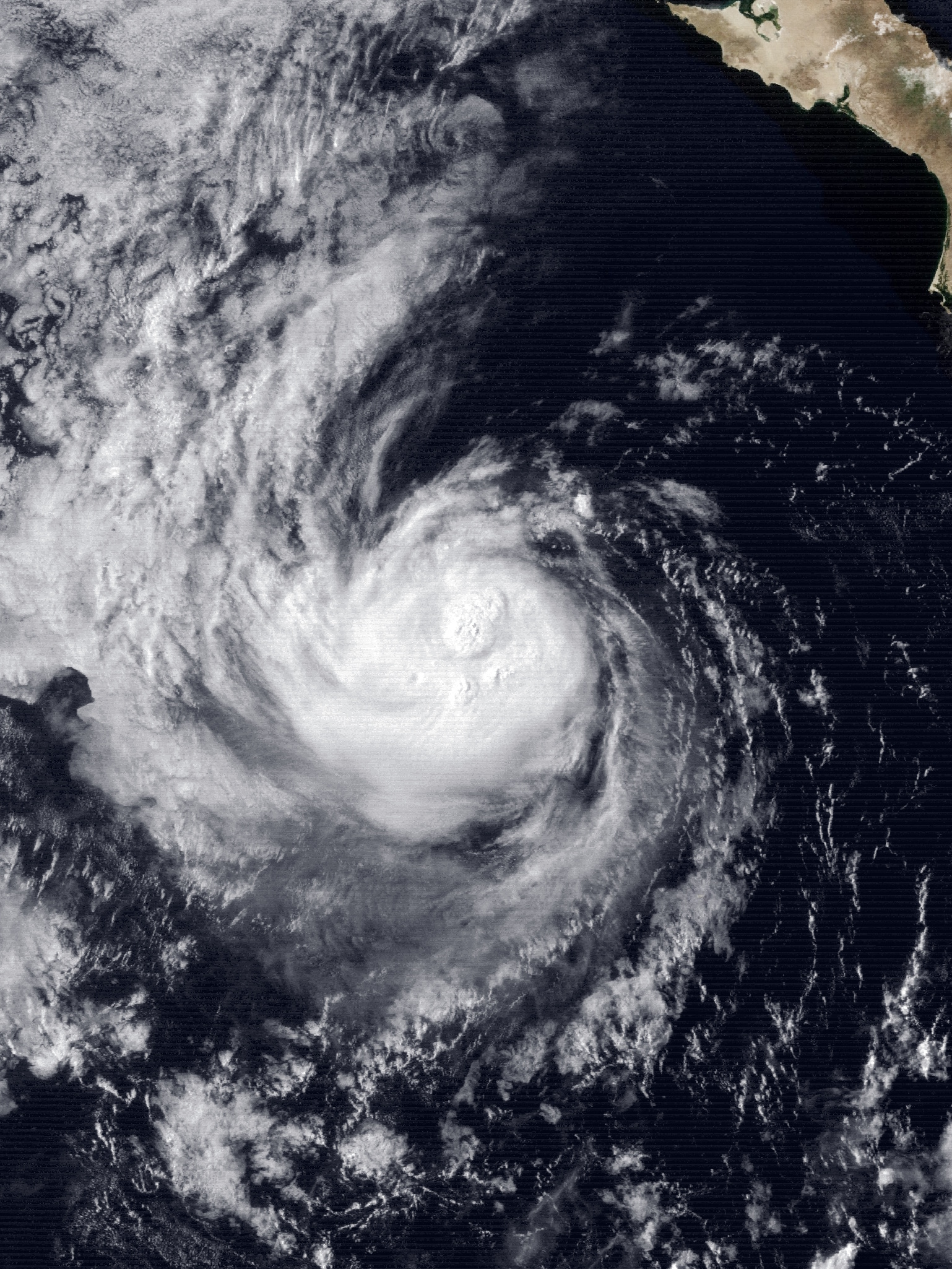
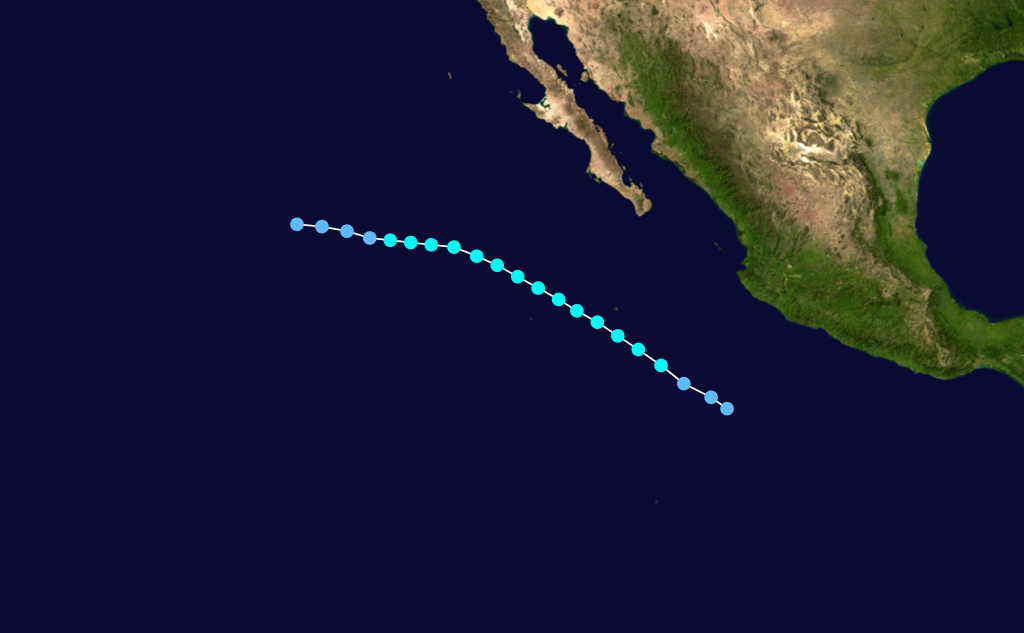
- Duration: July 28 – August 2
- Peak intensity: 65 mph (100 km/h) (1-min); 992 mbar (hPa)

Isis formed on July 28 as a depression and became a tropical storm the next day. Isis peaked as a strong tropical storm with 65 mph (105 km/h) winds on July 30. Due to cooler water, it weakened to a depression on the first and dissipated the next day. Isis degenerated to a broad area of low pressure on August 2.

=== Hurricane Javier ===
- Category 1 hurricane (SSHWS)
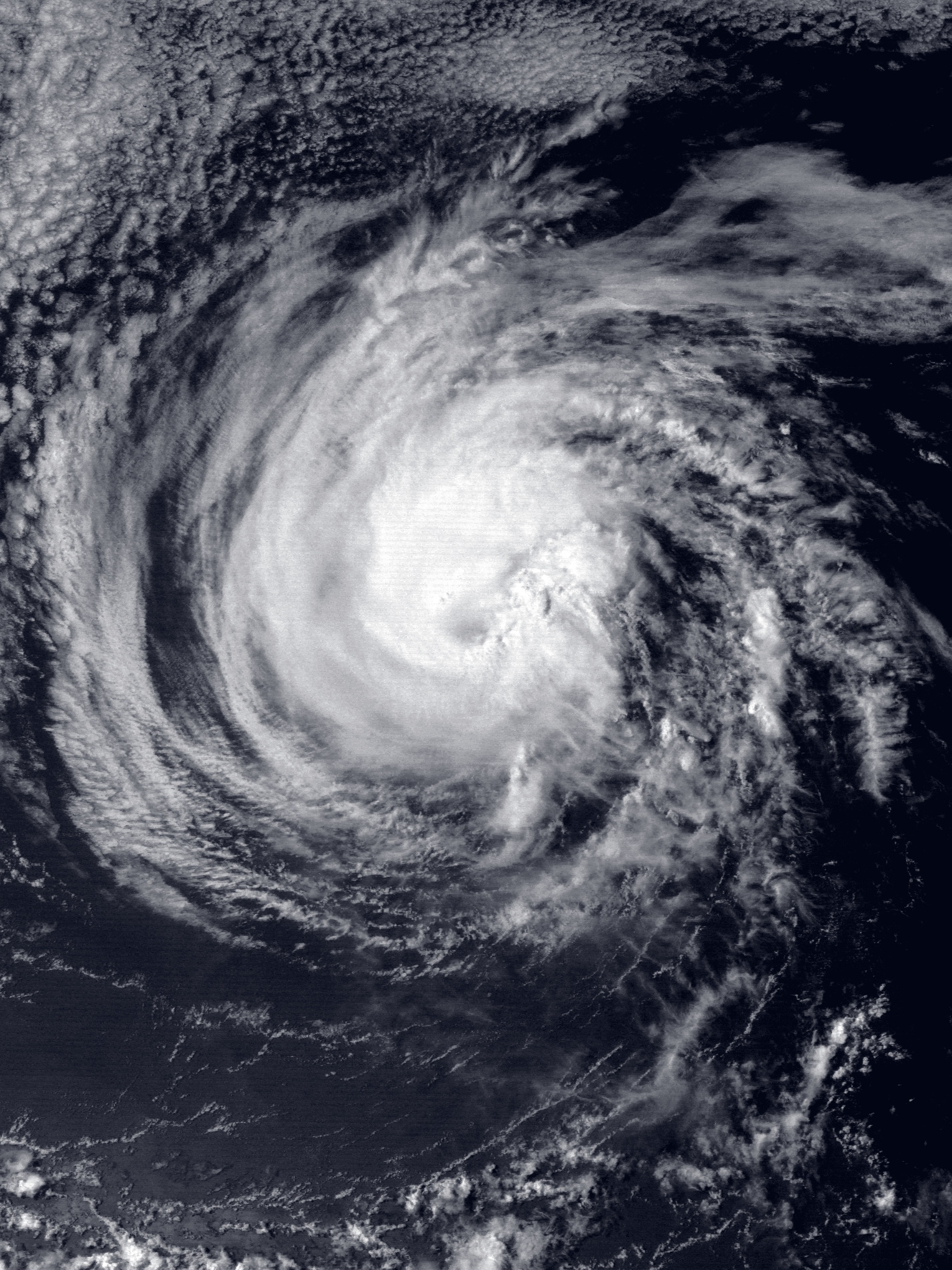
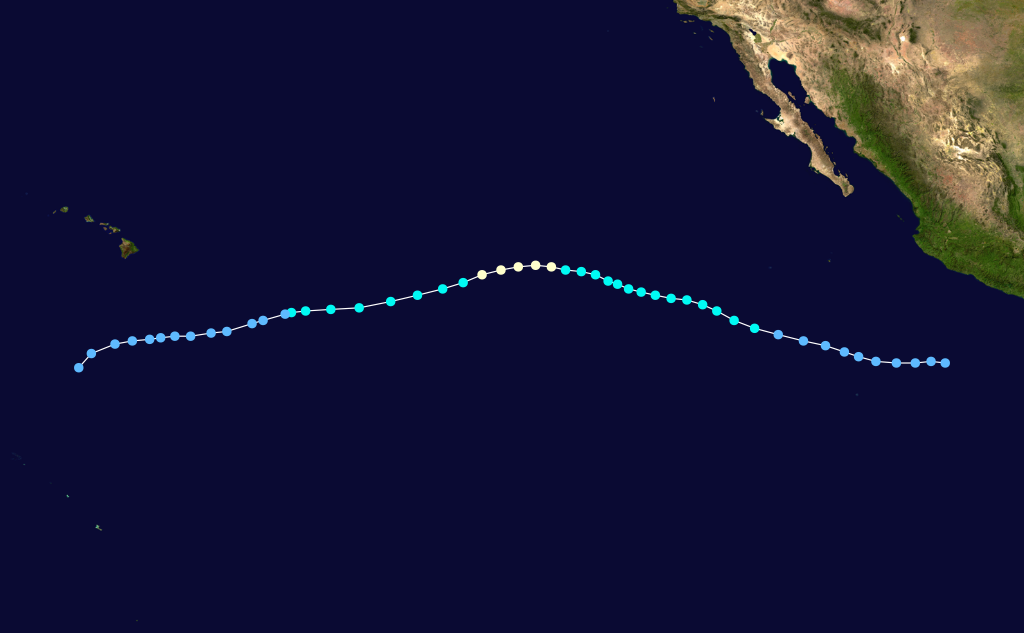
- Duration: July 30 – August 12
- Peak intensity: 80 mph (130 km/h) (1-min); 985 mbar (hPa)

Hurricane Javier originated from a tropical wave that left Africa on July 17. Around the time it entered the Pacific on July 27, the system was declared a tropical depression on July 30 while moving westward. On August 2, the system was upgraded to a tropical storm. Around this time, Javier turned west-northwest, before turning west, and later, west-southwest. Shortly after turning west, Javier intensified into a hurricane. By August 6, Hurricane Javier had attained peak wind speeds of 80 mph (130 km/h). After hanging on to hurricane strength for a day, Javier began to weaken. On August 8, Javier entered the Central Pacific. Javier continued to weaken while moving west-southwest. On August 9, Javier had weakened into a tropical depression. By August 12, Javier dissipated south of Hawaii. As a dissipating tropical depression, some rainfall and showers were recorded along the Hawaiian islands.

=== Tropical Depression Twelve-E ===
- Tropical depression (SSHWS)
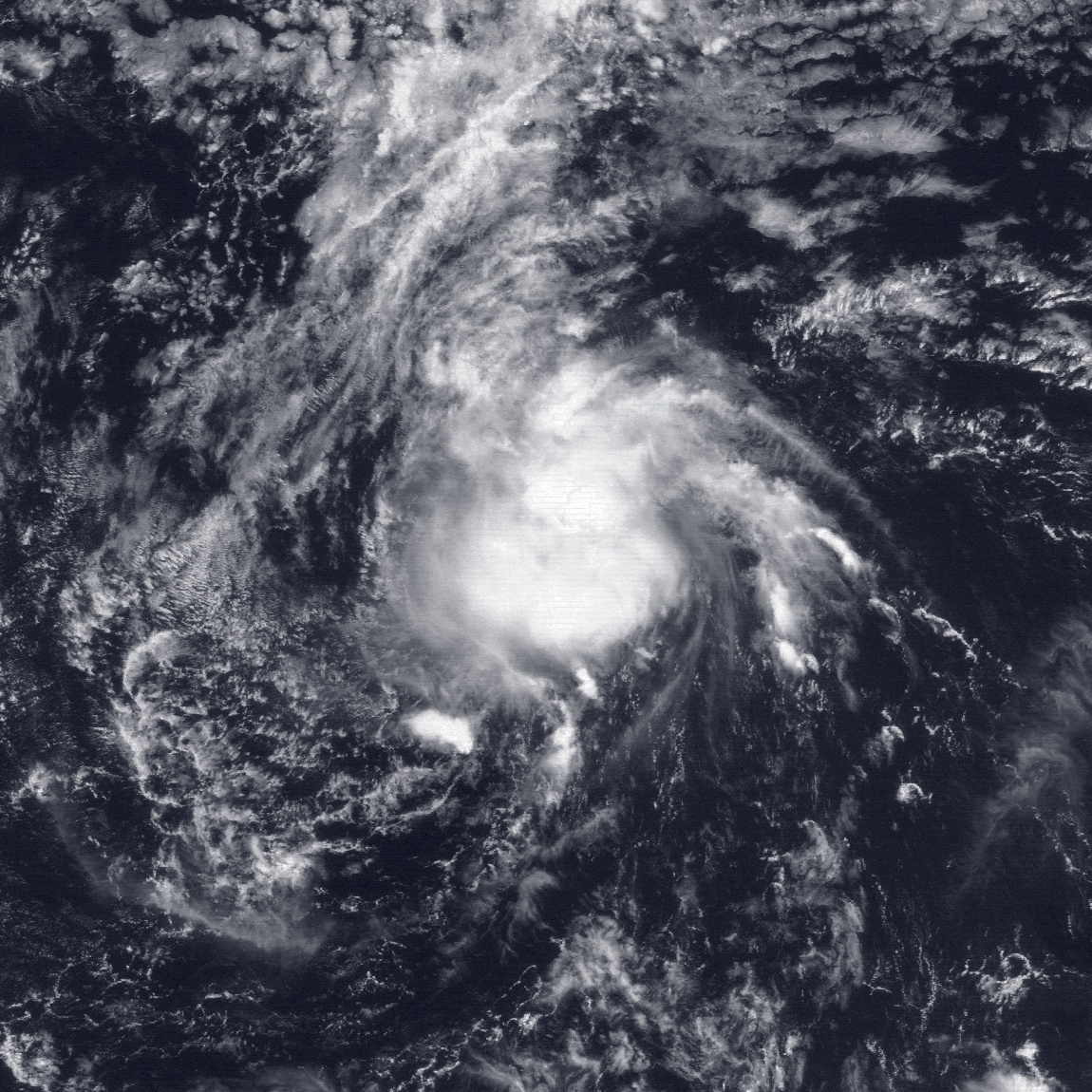
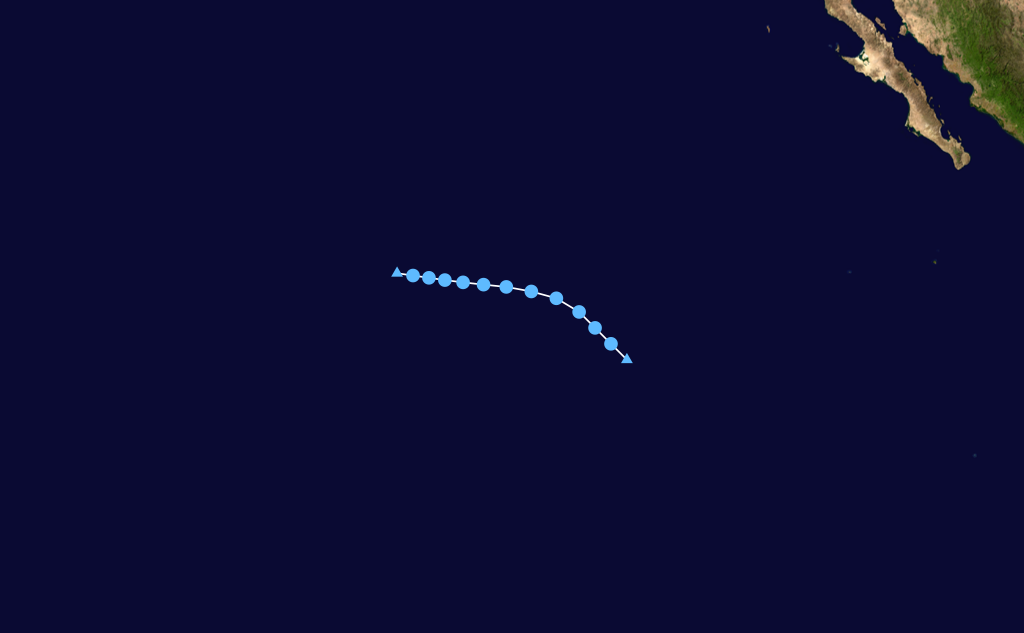
- Duration: August 10 – August 13
- Peak intensity: 35 mph (55 km/h) (1-min); 1006 mbar (hPa)

Twelve-E had a peak windspeed of 35 mph (56 km/h), and a pressure of 1,006 mbar (29.7 inHg). It formed on August 10, and dissipated on August 13.

=== Tropical Storm Kay ===
- Tropical storm (SSHWS)
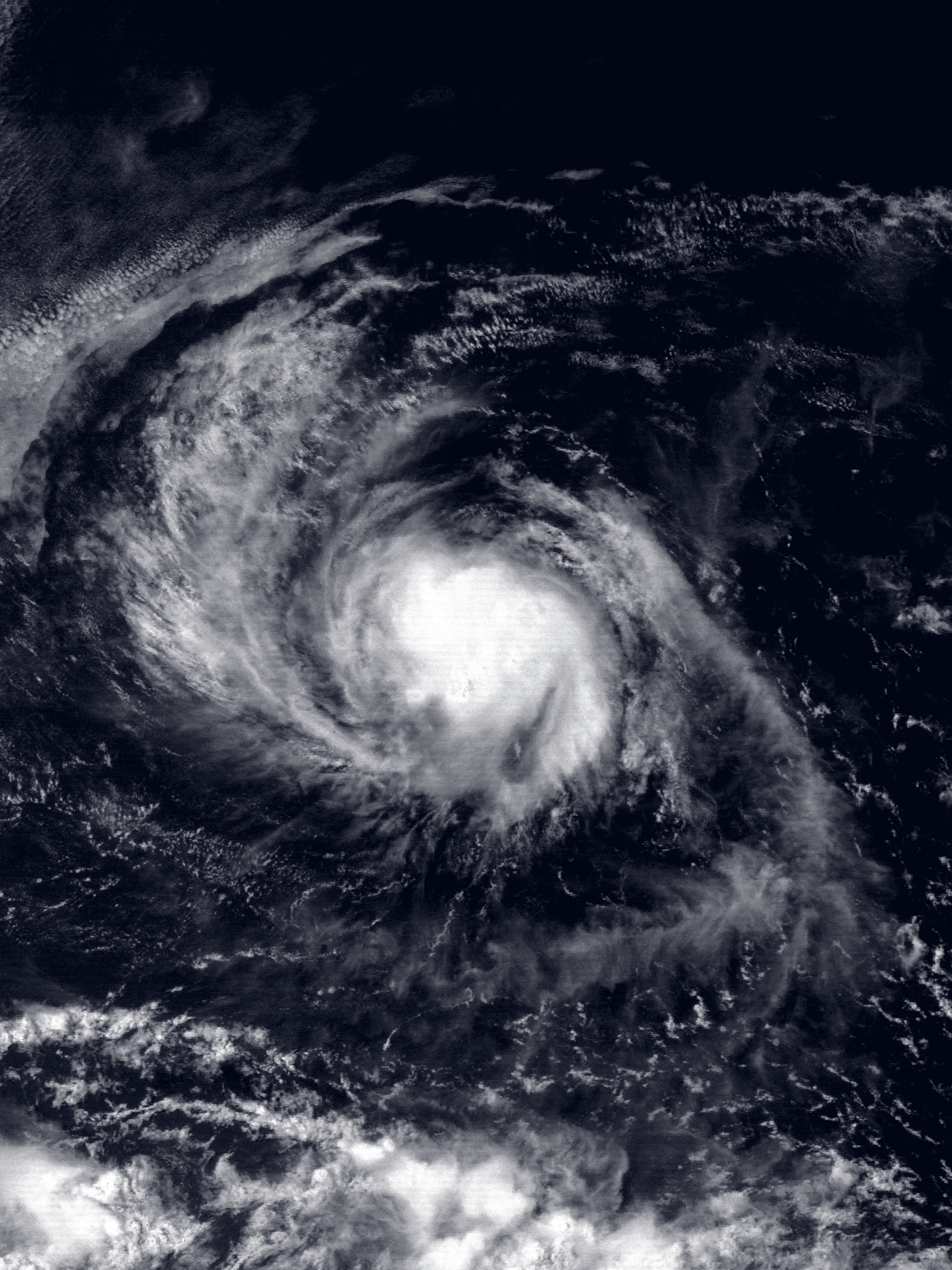
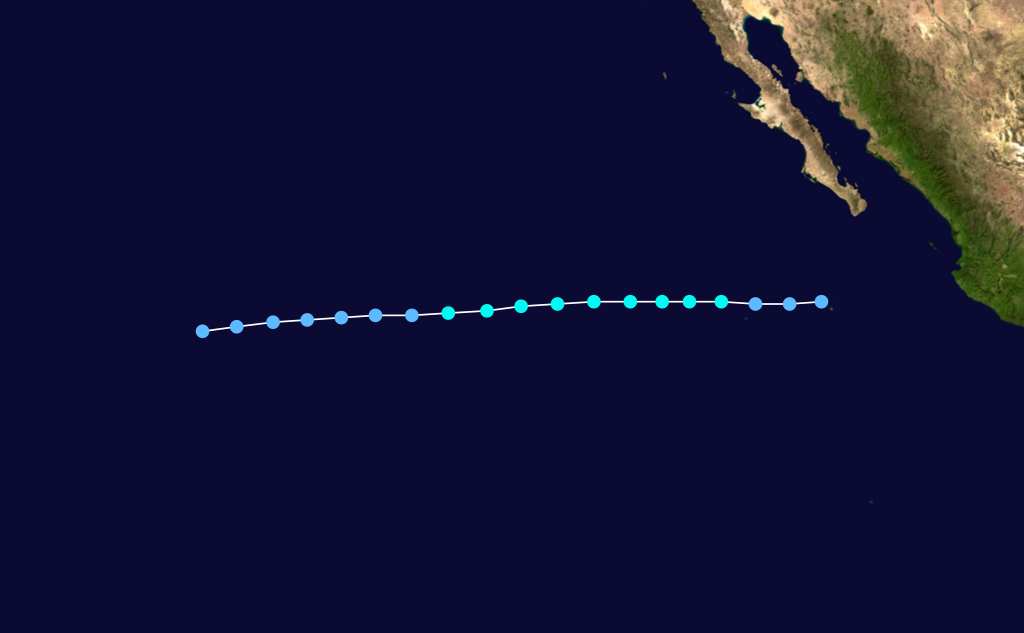
- Duration: August 18 – August 22
- Peak intensity: 50 mph (85 km/h) (1-min); 1000 mbar (hPa)

A depression formed on August 18. It became a tropical storm shortly after forming and was named Kay. Kay was a short lived system. Its peak intensity was only 50 mph (80 km/h). However, Kay was a very small tropical storm. It dissipated on August 22.

=== Hurricane Lester ===
- Category 1 hurricane (SSHWS)
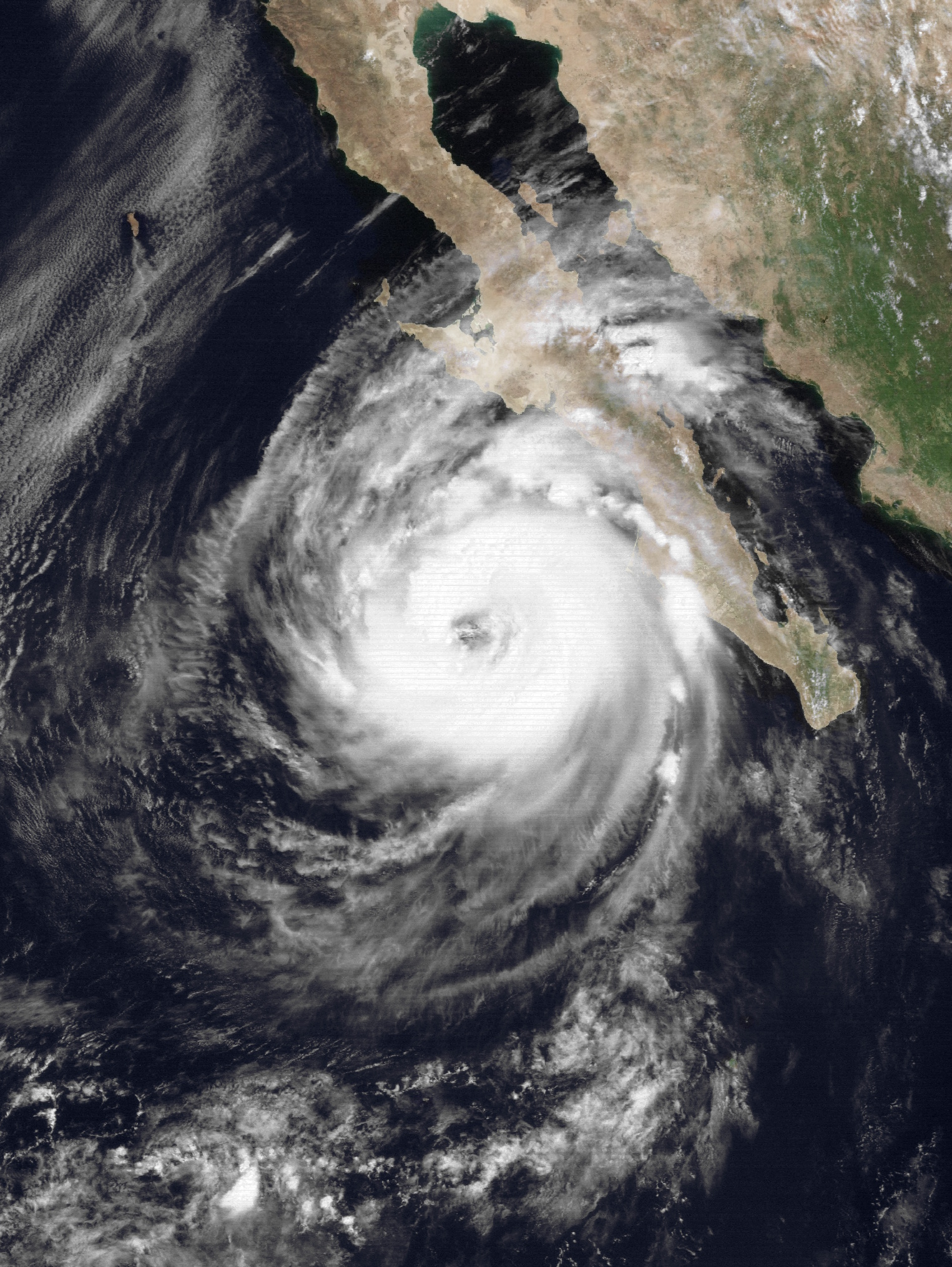
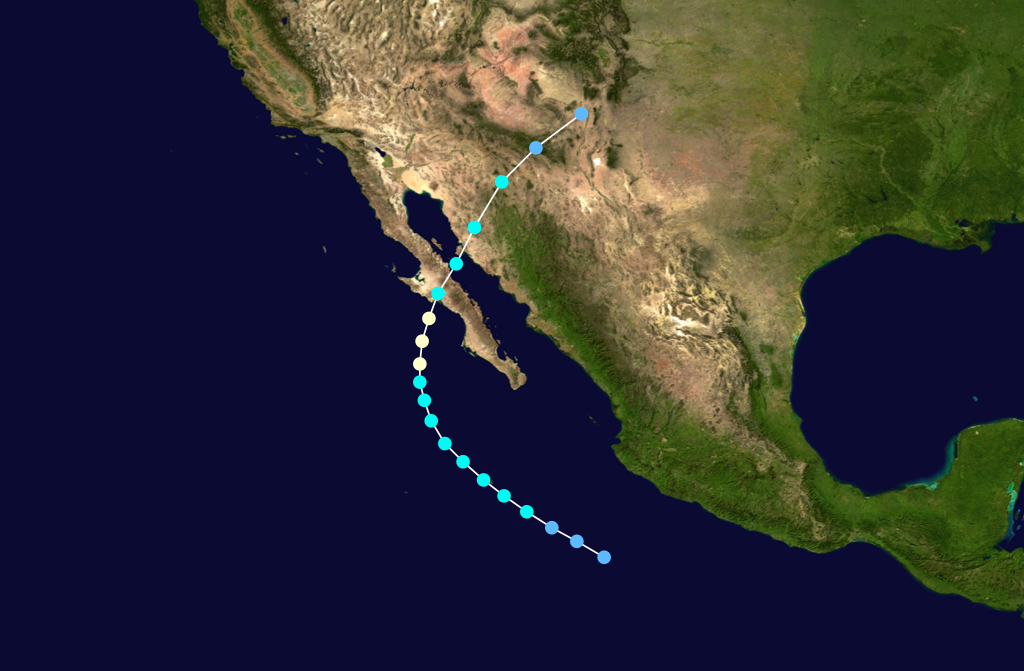
- Duration: August 20 – August 24
- Peak intensity: 80 mph (130 km/h) (1-min); 985 mbar (hPa)

Tropical Depression Fourteen-E formed on August 20 from a tropical wave that began to show signs of organized on August 19. At the time of the upgrade, it was located about 275 miles (443 km) south-southwest of Manzanillo. The depression slowly strengthened and steadily organized attained tropical storm status late on August 20. The next day, Lester turned to the north. Lester intensified into a hurricane late on August 22 while located about 240 miles (390 km) west of La Paz. The hurricane continued to organize and Lester attained peak winds of 85 mph (137 km/h) on August 23 before making landfall as a minimal hurricane near Punta Abreojos, Baja California Sur. After passing through the northern Gulf of California, it made a second landfall in the state of Sonora as a tropical storm. Lester entered Arizona as a tropical storm on August 24, the first time since 1967 that a Pacific hurricane entered the United States as a tropical storm. The low-level circulation subsequently dissipated over New Mexico, though the remnants transitioned into an extratropical cyclone, and subsequently merged with the remnants of Hurricane Andrew and another frontal system on August 29.

Hurricane Lester produced heavy rainfall across its path with a peak rainfall occurring in Mulege. Extensive flood damage was reported west of Hermosillo. A large highway was damaged and many communities were destroyed. Flash flooding from Lester caused 10,000 people to be evacuated from their homes. In addition, mudslides killed three people, and left 5,000 homeless. The remnants of Lester produced heavy rainfall across the Southwestern United States causing flash flooding of arroyos and moderate flooding in Denver. Snowfall from the storm generated traffic problems in mountainous areas. The remnants of Lester extended through the eastern United States, resulting in rainfall records in Minnesota, Nebraska, Colorado, and North Dakota. In all, Hurricane Lester resulted in $3 million (1992 USD) in damage.

=== Tropical Storm Madeline ===
- Tropical storm (SSHWS)
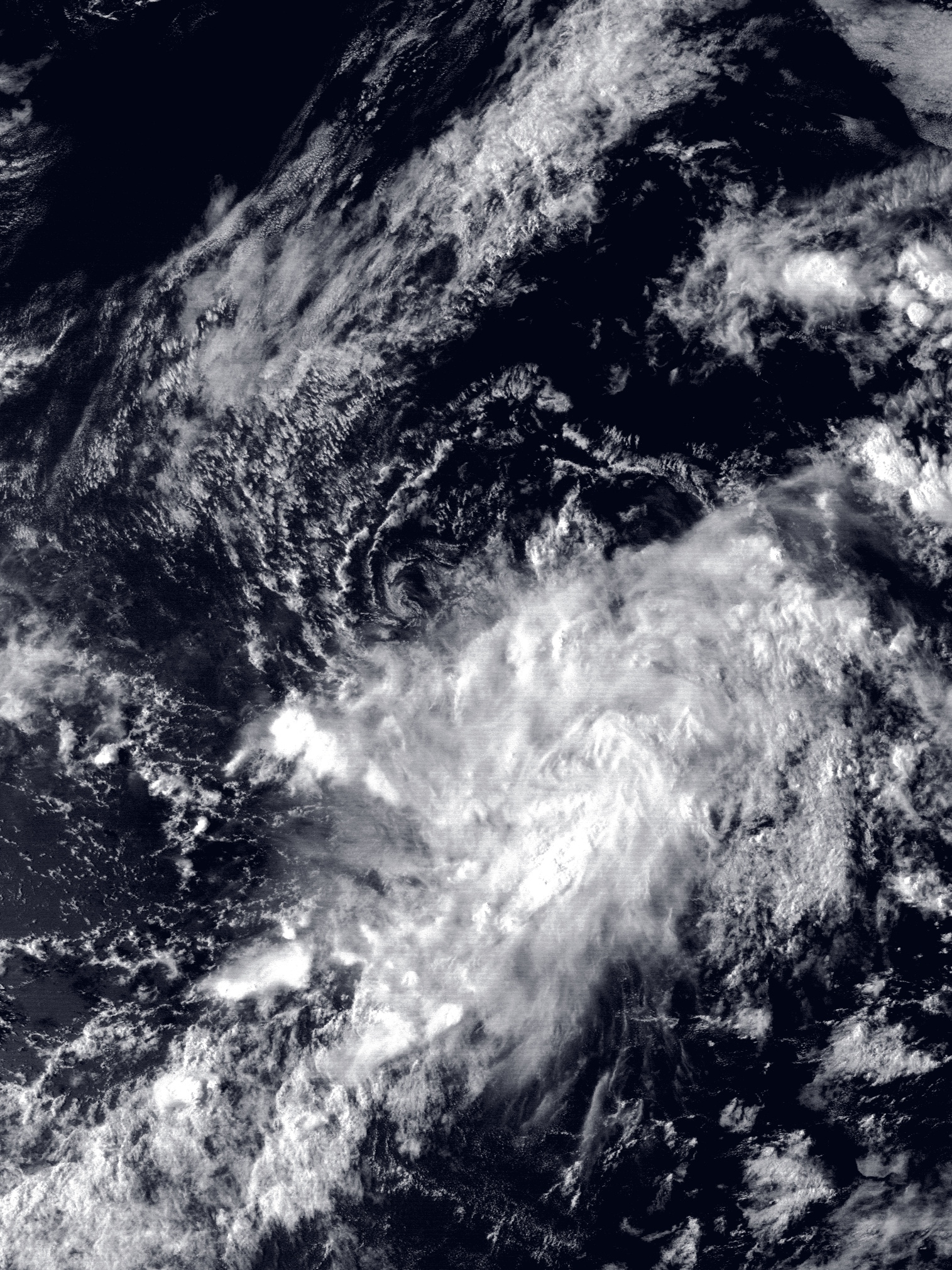
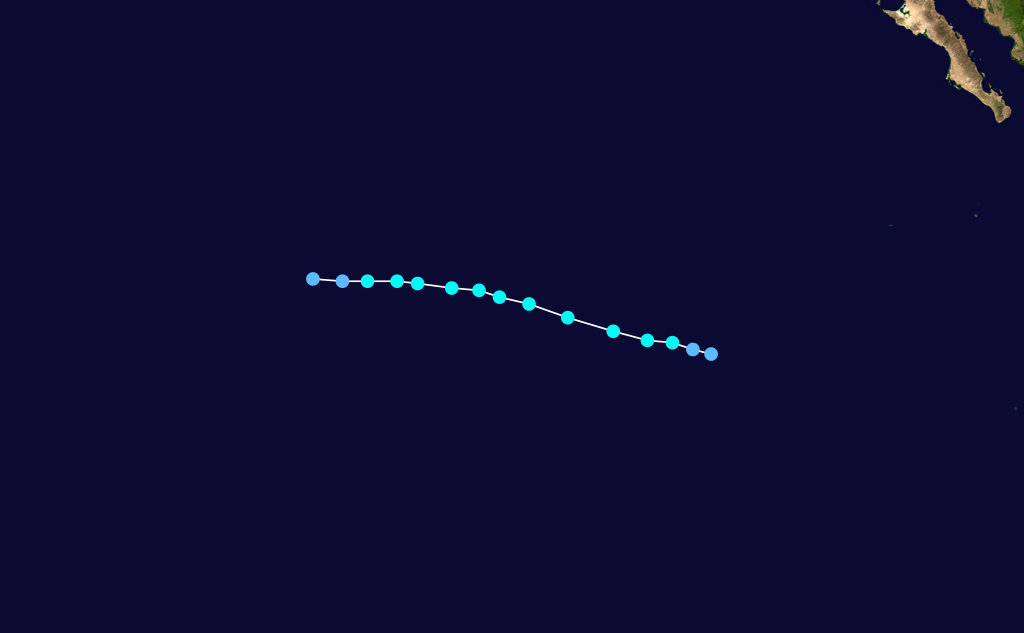
- Duration: August 27 – August 31
- Peak intensity: 50 mph (85 km/h) (1-min); 999 mbar (hPa)

Far in the open ocean, a tropical wave organized into Tropical Depression Fifteen-E on August 27. Banding and convection increased, and the depression became a tropical storm the next day. Development continued, and Madeline peaked with a minimum pressure of 999 mbar (29.5 inHg), and winds of 50 mph (80 km/h), on August 29. As the system progressed westward, it entered a region of strong wind shear and had dissipated on August 31.

=== Tropical Storm Newton ===
- Tropical storm (SSHWS)
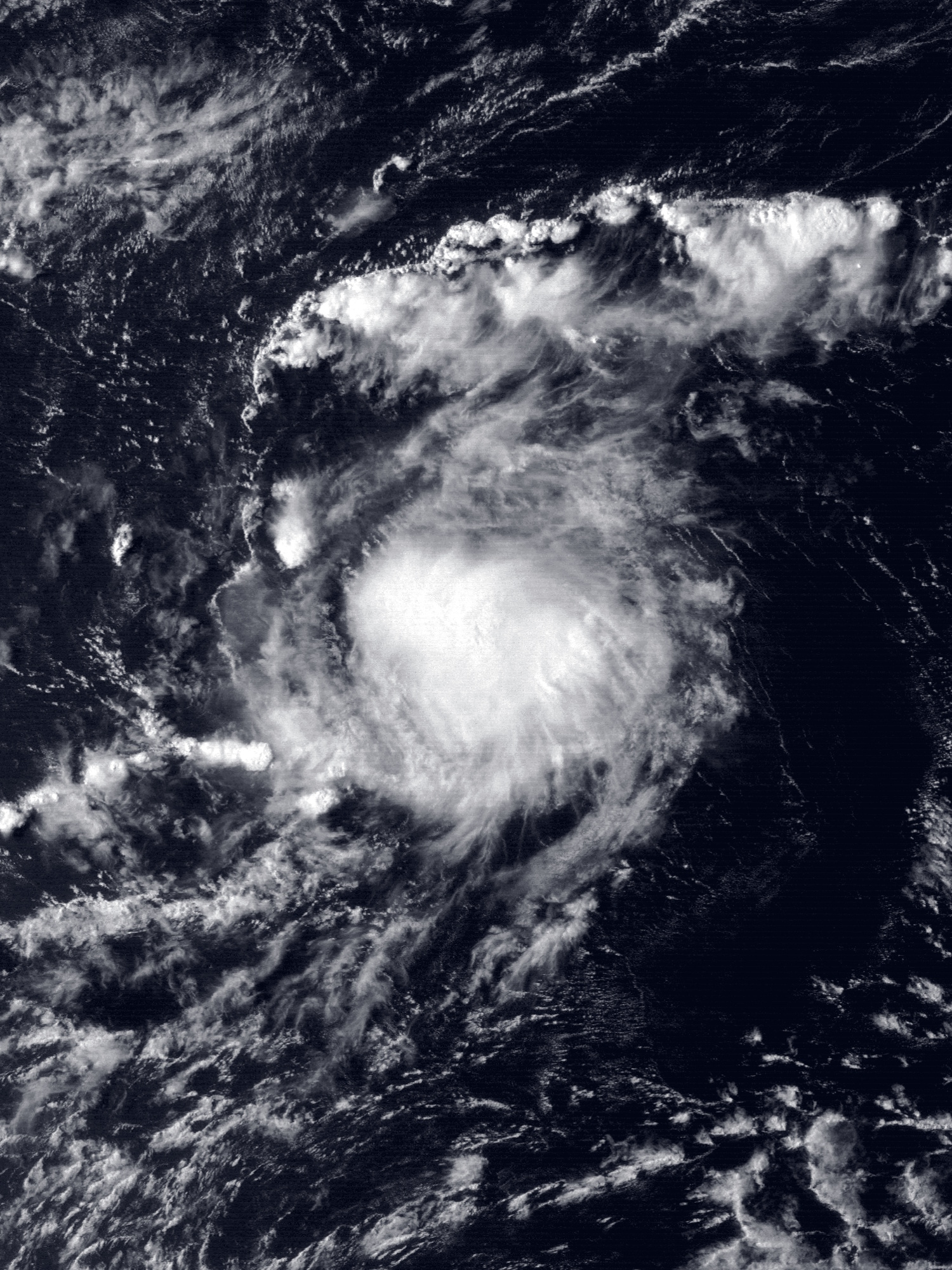
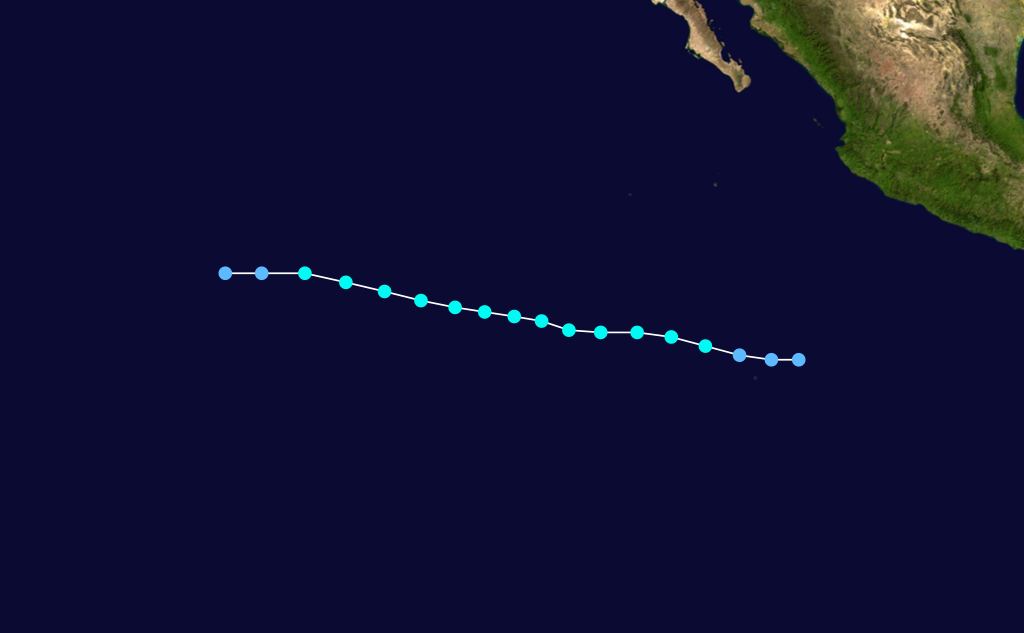
- Duration: August 27 – August 31
- Peak intensity: 50 mph (85 km/h) (1-min); 999 mbar (hPa)

Newton was a fairly short-lived storm. It formed from a tropical wave on August 27. It became a tropical storm, was named Newton 18 hours later, and dissipated four days later on August 31.

=== Hurricane Orlene ===
- Category 4 hurricane (SSHWS)
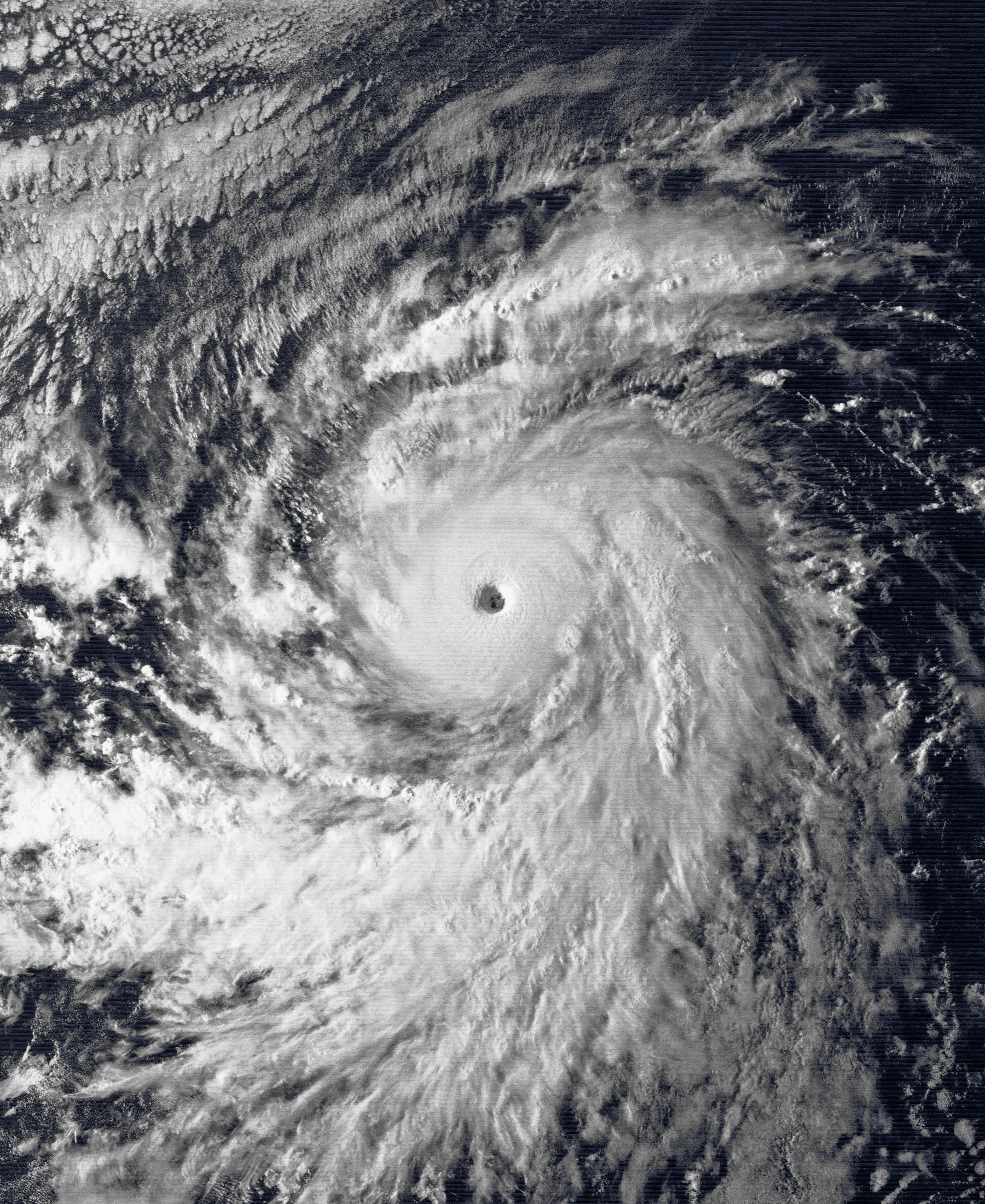
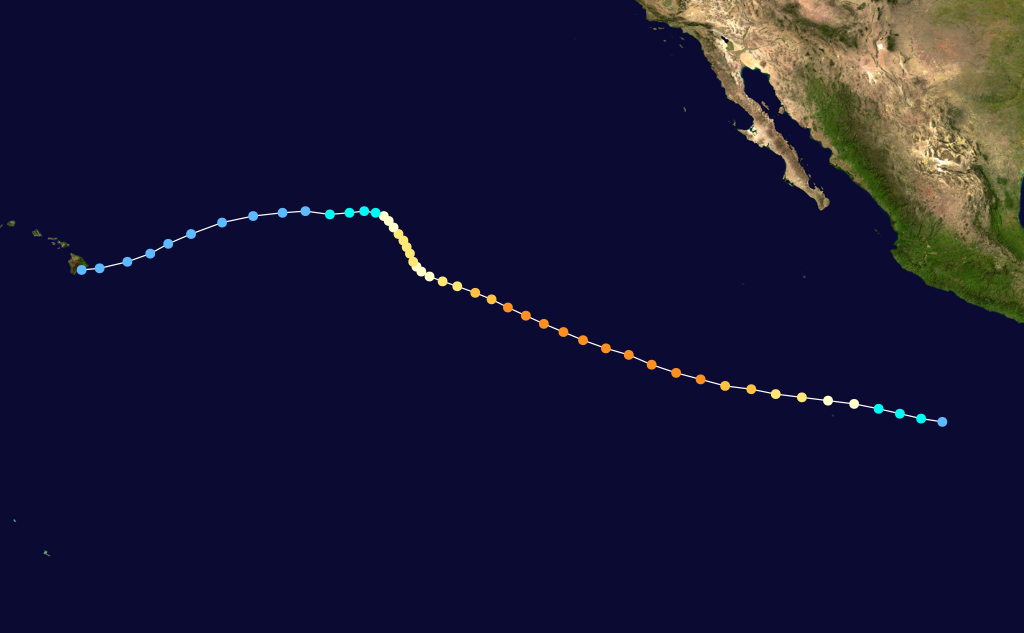
- Duration: September 2 – September 14
- Peak intensity: 145 mph (230 km/h) (1-min); 934 mbar (hPa)

Tropical Depression Seventeen-E formed in September 2, rapidly intensifying to a tropical storm the next day, being assigned the name Orlene, then it strengthened into a Category 1 hurricane late that day. Orlene peaked at Category 4 major hurricane status on September 6. The system held intensity for a day or so, with gradual weakening due to shear over the area, but the shear relaxed over the cyclone early on September 9, which brought about a quick restrengthening phase on September 9, although it stopped, and the weakening trend resumed later that day. Orlene downgraded back to a tropical storm on September 10, and finally a depression on September 12, around the same time that it moved into the Central Pacific. It dissipated two days later, on September 14, after making landfall as a tropical depression on the Big Island of Hawaii. The remnants caused downpours and washed out roads, and the damage was minimal, though some areas got up to 4 in (100 mm) of rain.

=== Hurricane Iniki ===
- Category 4 hurricane (SSHWS)
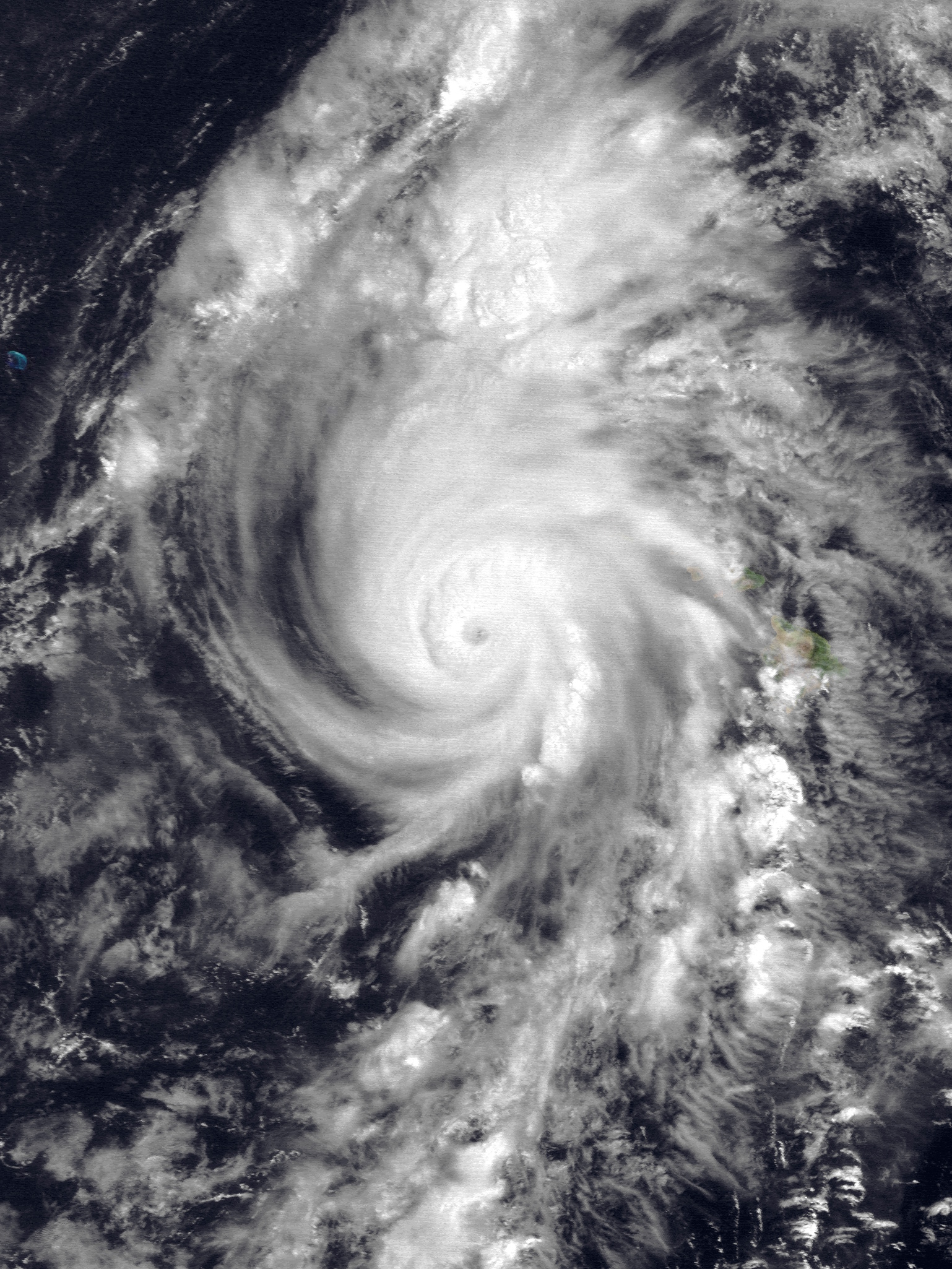
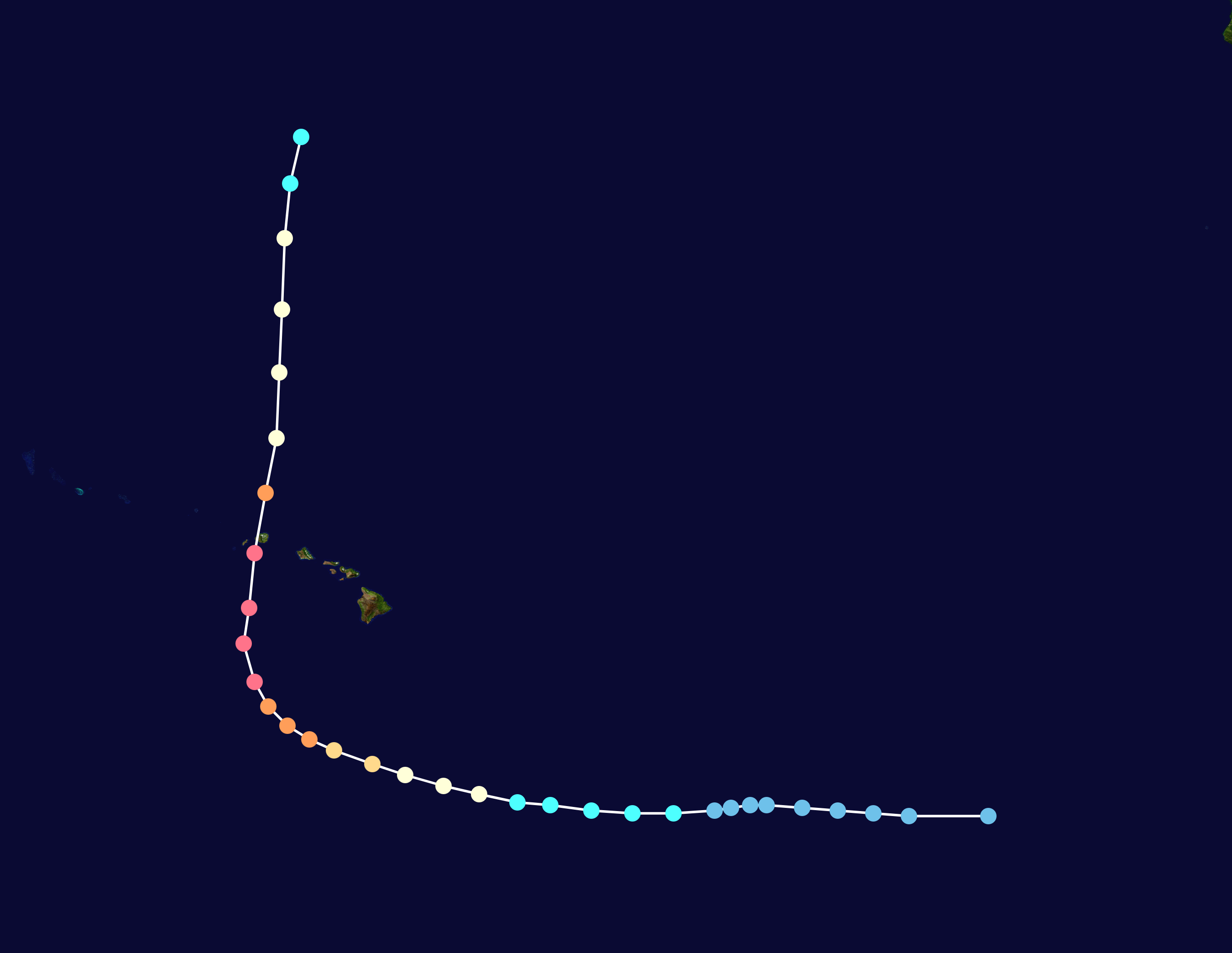
- Duration: September 5 – September 13
- Peak intensity: 145 mph (230 km/h) (1-min); 938 mbar (hPa)

Forming on September 5 about 1,700 miles (2,700 km) southwest of Cabo San Lucas, the depression continued quickly westward and remained weak until September 8, when it strengthened into a tropical storm. Having been designated in the Central Pacific, the storm was given the name Iniki. Iniki continued westward and strengthened over the unusually favorable central Pacific; it reached hurricane status on September 9 while 470 miles (760 km) south-southeast of Hilo. The subtropical ridge, which typically keeps hurricanes well away from the Hawaiian Islands, weakened due to an approaching upper level-trough and allowed Iniki to turn to the northwest. With very favorable upper-level outflow and warm water temperatures, Iniki steadily intensified, and attained major hurricane status on September 10 while south-southwest of the island chain. As Iniki turned to the north, it continued to strengthen, reaching a peak of 145 mph (233 km/h) winds on September 11 while 170 miles (270 km) south-southwest of Kauaʻi. It continued rapidly to the north-northeast, and made landfall as a Category 4 hurricane on the Saffir-Simpson Hurricane Scale.

After crossing the island, Iniki weakened rapidly, and became extratropical on September 13 about halfway between Alaska and Hawaiʻi. The Central Pacific Hurricane Center (CPHC) failed to issue tropical cyclone warnings and watches for the hurricane well in advance as the CPHC forecast Iniki to remain well south of the island chain until September 10, less than 24 hours before landfall that any warning was given to the public. Iniki's large wind field caused nearly 30,000 people to evacuate to 110 public shelters in Oʻahu.

Hurricane Iniki's high winds caused extensive damage in Kauaʻi. 1,421 houses were completely destroyed, and 63 were lost from the storm surge and wave action. A total of 5,152 homes were severely damaged, while 7,178 received minor damage. Iniki's high winds also downed 26.5% of the island's transmission poles, 37% of its distribution poles, and 35% of its 800-mile (1,300 km) distribution wire system. Some areas were without power for up to three months after the storm. More than 7,000 people were homeless after the storm's passage. One person died when struck by debris, while another died when a portion of her house fell on her. Offshore, two humans died when their boat capsized. More than 100 injuries can be attributed to Iniki.

Upon passing by Oʻahu, Iniki produced tides of 1.7–3 feet (0.52–0.91 m) above normal. Prolonged periods of high waves severely eroded and damaged the southwestern coast of Oʻahu. In all, Hurricane Iniki caused several million dollars in property damage, and two deaths on Oʻahu. Overall, Iniki was the costliest hurricane to strike the state of Hawaiʻi, causing $3.1 billion in damage. In all, Iniki also was responsible for 6 deaths. During the aftermath of the storm, communities held parties to necessarily consume perishable food from unpowered refrigerators and freezers. Kauaʻi citizens remained hopeful for monetary aid from the government or insurance companies, though after six months they felt annoyed with the lack of help. though military effectively provided aid for their immediate needs. Amateur radio proved to be helpful during the three weeks after the storm, with volunteers coming from around the Pacific to assist in the recovery. Local operators assisted with the American Red Cross to provide disaster relief centers across Kauai. Many insurance companies left Hawaiʻi after the storm, forcing Hawaii to launch a Hurricane Relief Fund in 1993 to help unprotected Hawaiʻi residents, but it was stopped in 2000.

=== Hurricane Paine ===
- Category 1 hurricane (SSHWS)
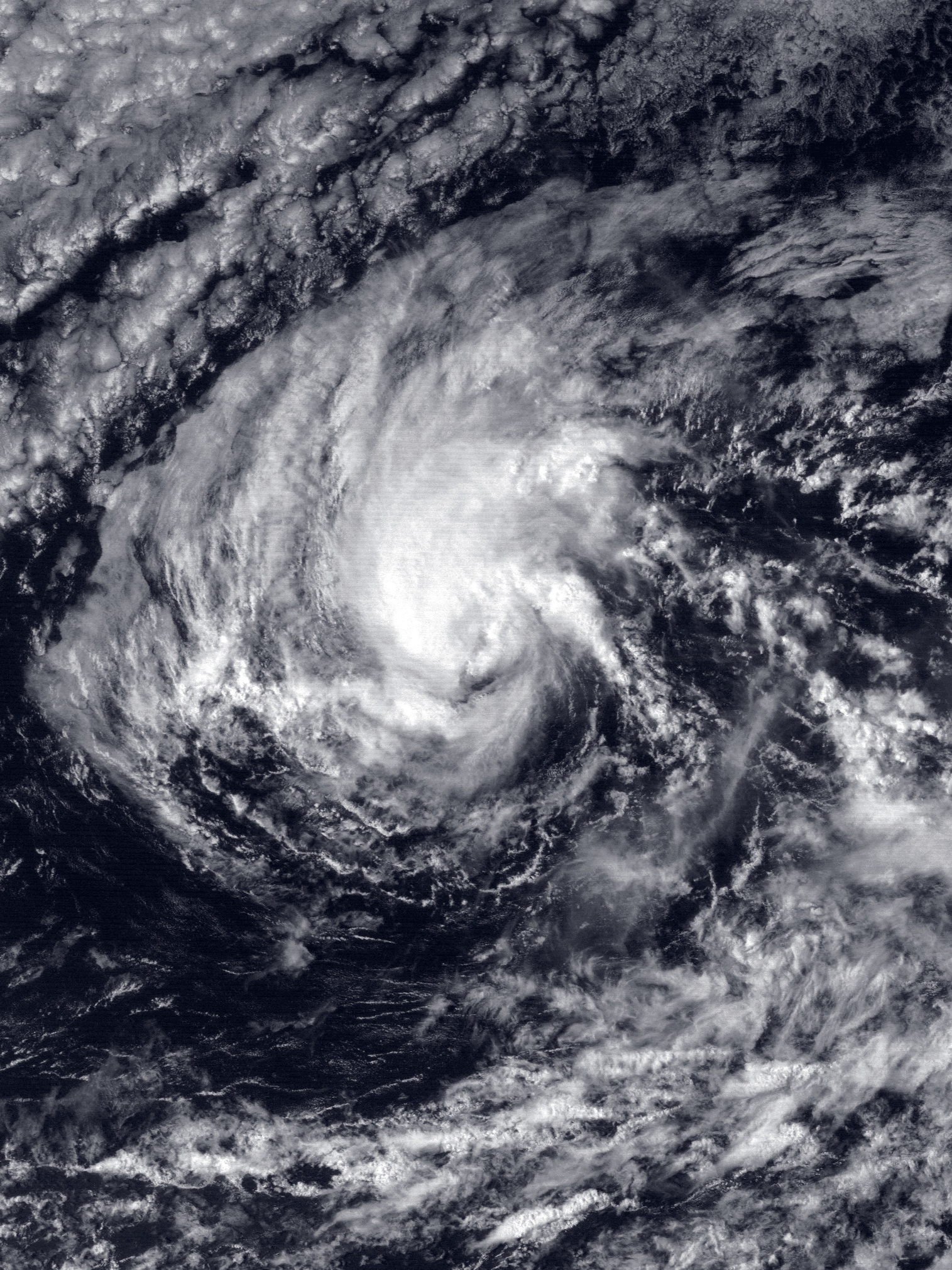
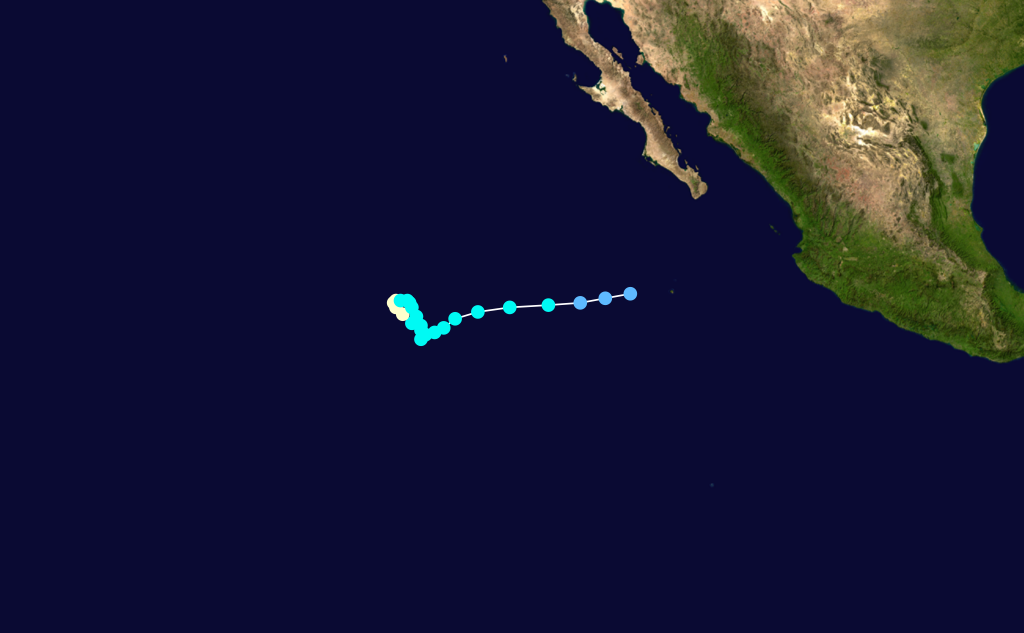
- Duration: September 11 – September 16
- Peak intensity: 75 mph (120 km/h) (1-min); 987 mbar (hPa)

The tropical wave from which Paine originated moved off the coast of Africa on August 25 and eventually crossed Central America. The circulation finally organized enough to be classified as Tropical Depression Nineteen-E early on September 11, a couple hundred miles southwest of Baja California. The depression moved west-southwest and intensified into Tropical Storm Paine. Gradually intensifying, the storm attained hurricane intensity on September 13. Paine reached peak intensity with maximum sustained winds of 75 mph (121 km/h) and a minimum central pressure of 987 mbar. Paine then stalled while executing a slow clockwise loop due to a trough and its proximity Hurricane Roslyn. By September 14, Paine weakened back to a tropical storm. By September 16, Paine had dissipated. The remnants of Paine were later absorbed by Roslyn.

=== Hurricane Roslyn ===
- Category 2 hurricane (SSHWS)
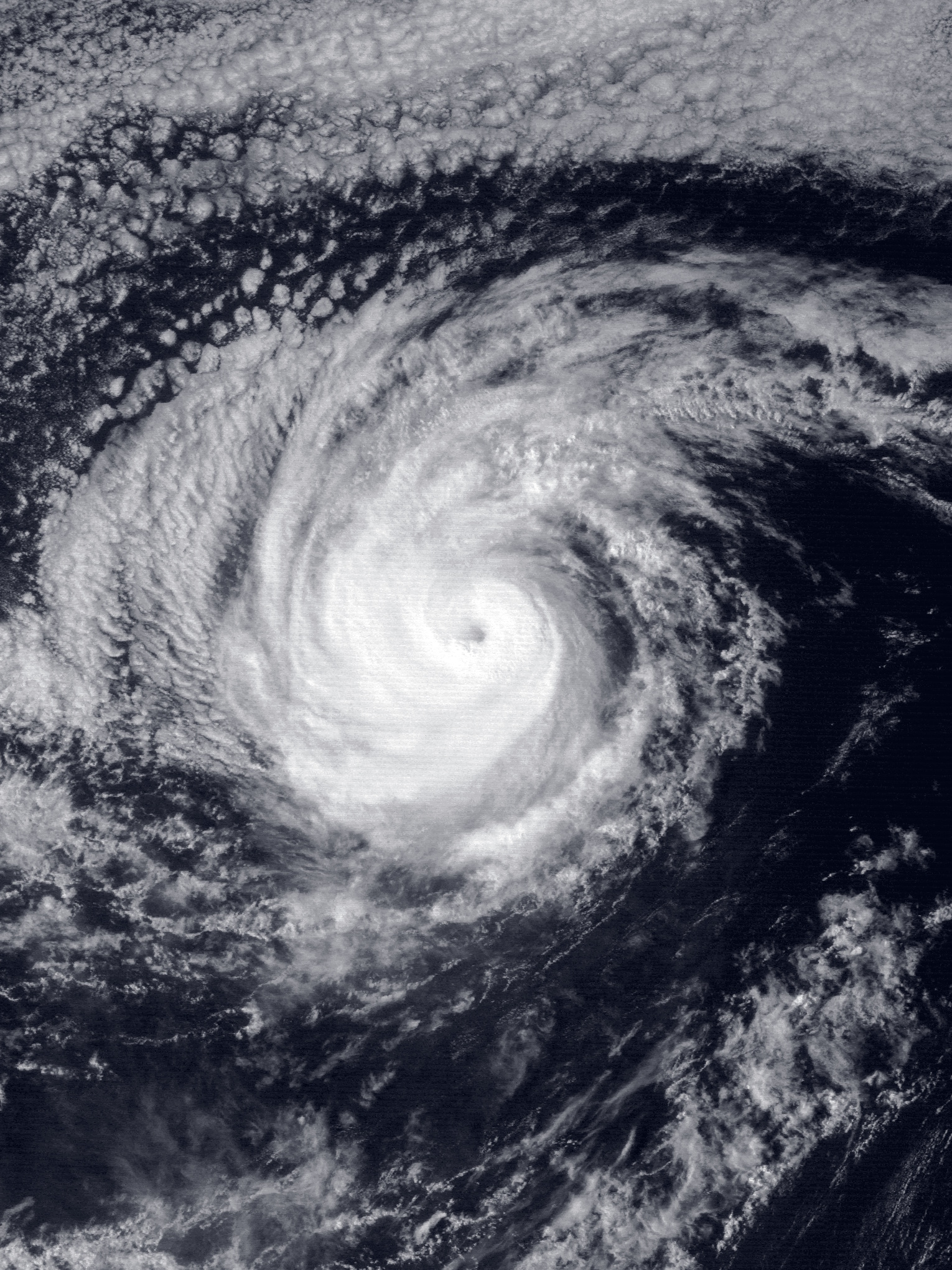
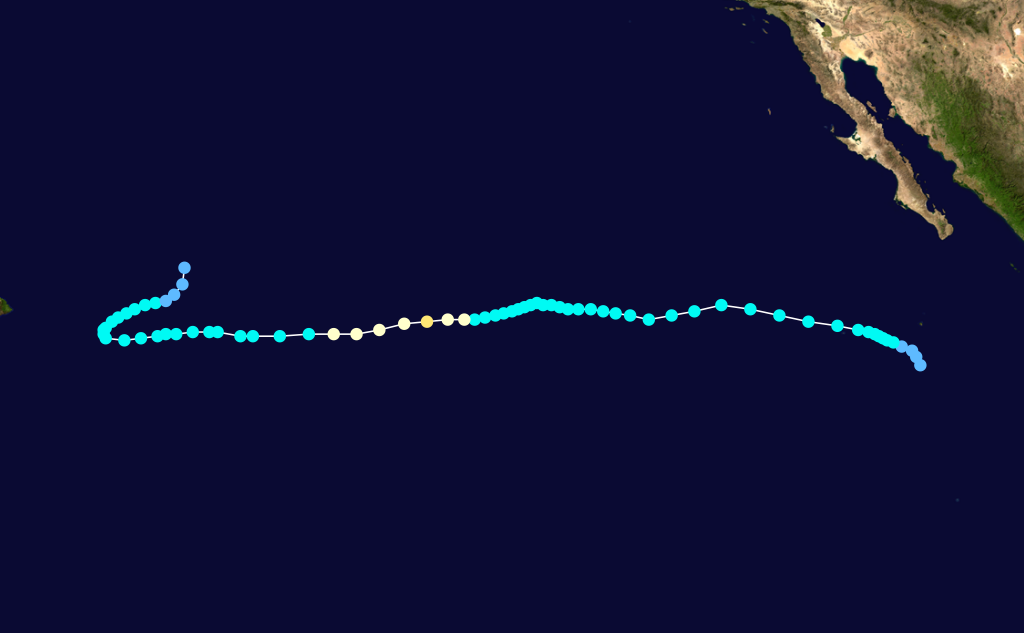
- Duration: September 13 – September 30
- Peak intensity: 100 mph (155 km/h) (1-min); 975 mbar (hPa)

On September 13, a tropical wave developed into Tropical Depression Twenty-E, about 416 mi (669 km) south of Baja California. Despite initial disorganization, the system was upgraded to Tropical Storm Roslyn. On September 15, Roslyn quickly intensified but began a short weakening trend as it passed through the wake of Hurricane Paine. Later that day, Roslyn began interacting with the weakening and nearby Paine, absorbing its remnants, although this merger didn't affect Roslyn's intensity. On the September 18, Roslyn began gradually strengthening. By September 21, Roslyn reached hurricane intensity. The hurricane peaked at Category 2 status on September 22, with a quick decrease in strength thereafter. Roslyn was downgraded to a tropical storm just as it crossed into the Central Pacific, and over the next several days, Roslyn turned northeast, and then north. The system finally dissipated on September 30.

=== Hurricane Seymour ===
- Category 1 hurricane (SSHWS)
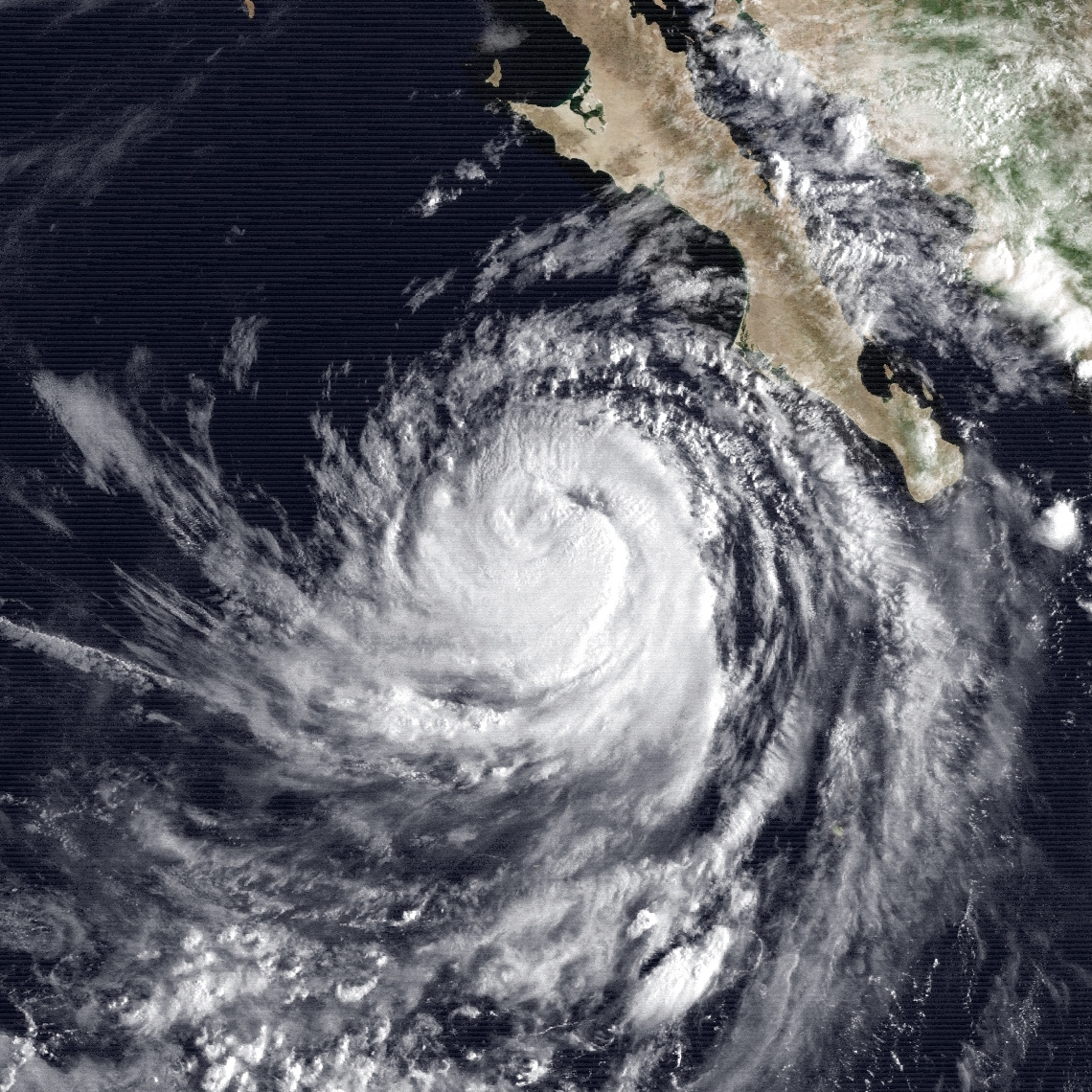
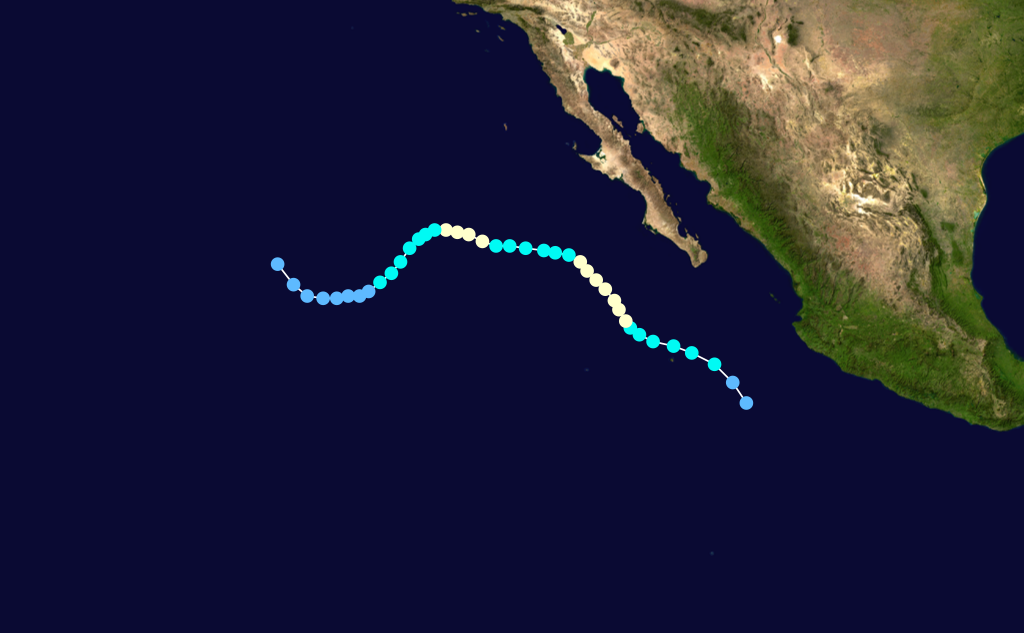
- Duration: September 17 – September 27
- Peak intensity: 85 mph (140 km/h) (1-min); 980 mbar (hPa)

On September 17, a tropical wave was upgraded into a tropical depression. The next day, the depression strengthened into Tropical Storm Seymour a couple hundred miles south of the southern tip of Baja California, and while continuing on a west-northwest and northwest track, Seymour reached hurricane strength on September 19. However, the system soon weakened to a tropical storm. Seymour began to turn west, and regained hurricane status on the September 23. However, Seymour only held hurricane intensity for a short period of time, and by that night, it had weakened back to a tropical storm. It then weakened to a depression two days later and dissipated on September 27.

=== Hurricane Tina ===
- Category 4 hurricane (SSHWS)
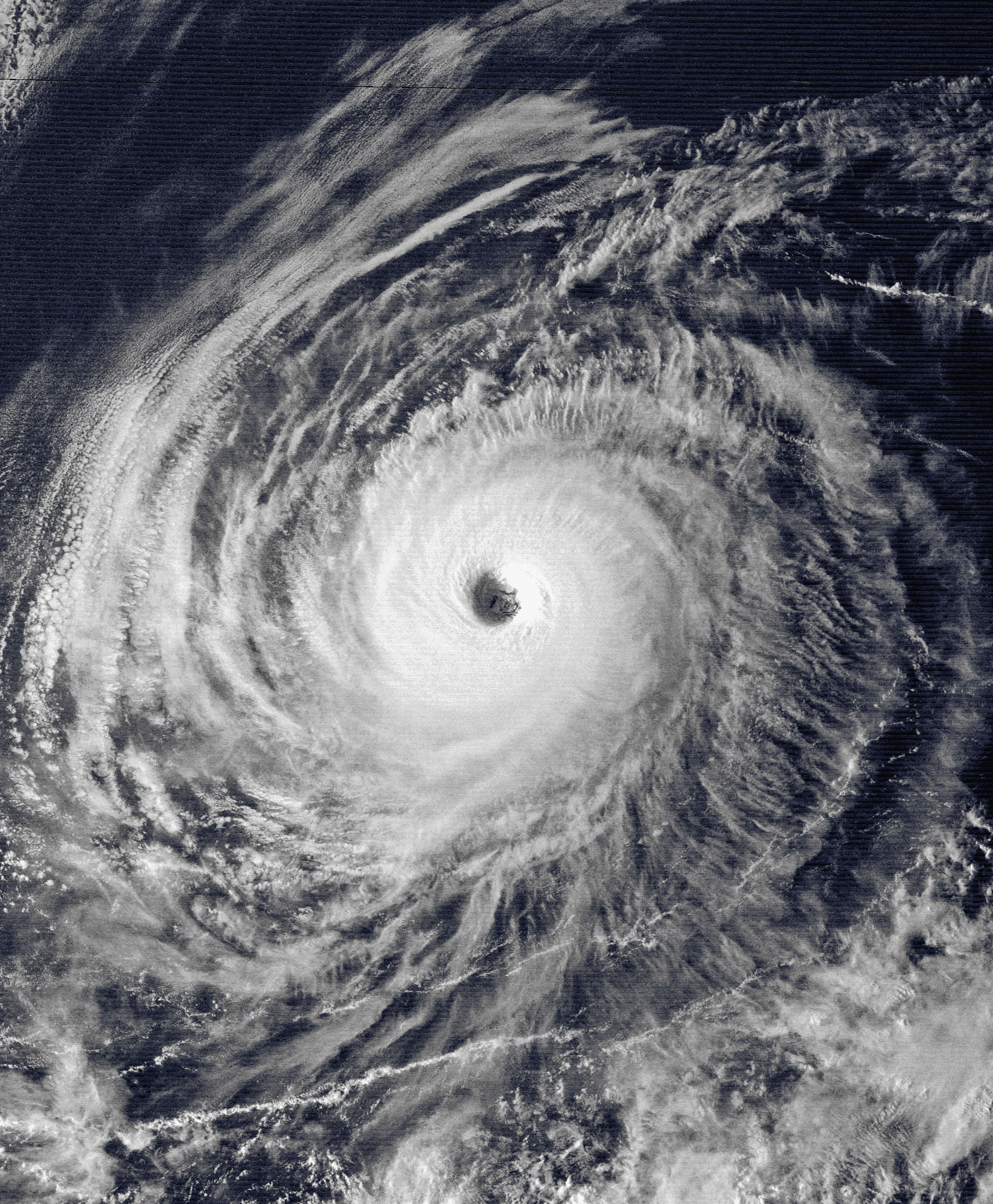
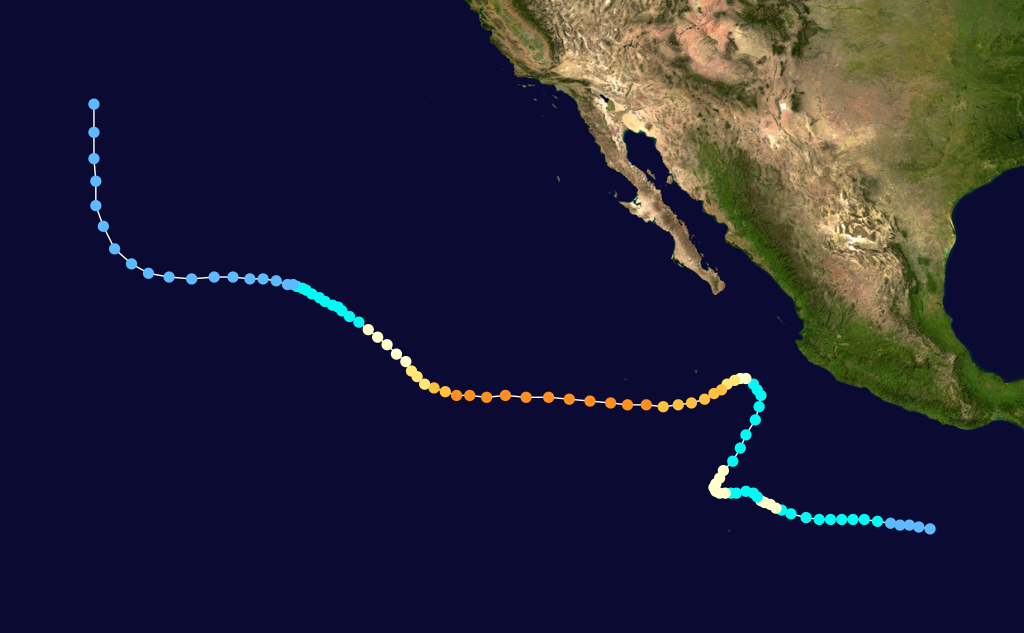
- Duration: September 17 – October 11
- Peak intensity: 150 mph (240 km/h) (1-min); 932 mbar (hPa)

A tropical wave exited the African coast on September 5, which eventually reached the Pacific and became more defined on September 16 to the south of Mexico. At 12:00 UTC on September 17, Tropical Depression 22E developed, becoming Tropical Storm Tina the next day. Tina reached hurricane status at 18:00 UTC on September 20, reaching winds of 85 mph (137 km/h) before wind shear weakened it, and deep convection decreased. Tina briefly weakened back into a tropical storm, but regained hurricane intensity for another two days. On September 25, Tina weakened back to a tropical storm. The storm took a sharp turn north-northeast towards Mexico, due to passing trough weakening the subtropical ridge. After two days moving toward Mexico, Tina turned back westward as a ridge built to the north. Entering an area of lower wind shear, Tina regained hurricane status on September 28, and quickly attained major hurricane status. After passing near Clarion Island, Tina attained peak intensity on September 30, with winds of 150 mph (240 km/h) and a minimum pressure of 932 mbar (27.5 inHg). This made it the strongest hurricane of the season. Soon after, Tina turned to the northwest into an area of cooler waters and stronger wind shear. It weakened to tropical storm status on October 4, and soon after only had limited thunderstorms near the center. On October 7, Tina fell to tropical depression status as it turned back to the west, generating intermittent convection. Two days later, the circulation crossed 140ºW into the central Pacific. Tina curved to the north, dissipating on October 11.

Due to its erratic track and slow motion, Tina was ongoing from September 17 to October 11, a span of 24 days. This was the record for the eastern Pacific Ocean, beating the record of 20 days held by Hurricane Fico in the 1978 season and surpassing Typhoon Rita's west Pacific 1972 record. It was itself surpassed just two years later by Hurricane John.

=== Hurricane Virgil ===
- Category 4 hurricane (SSHWS)
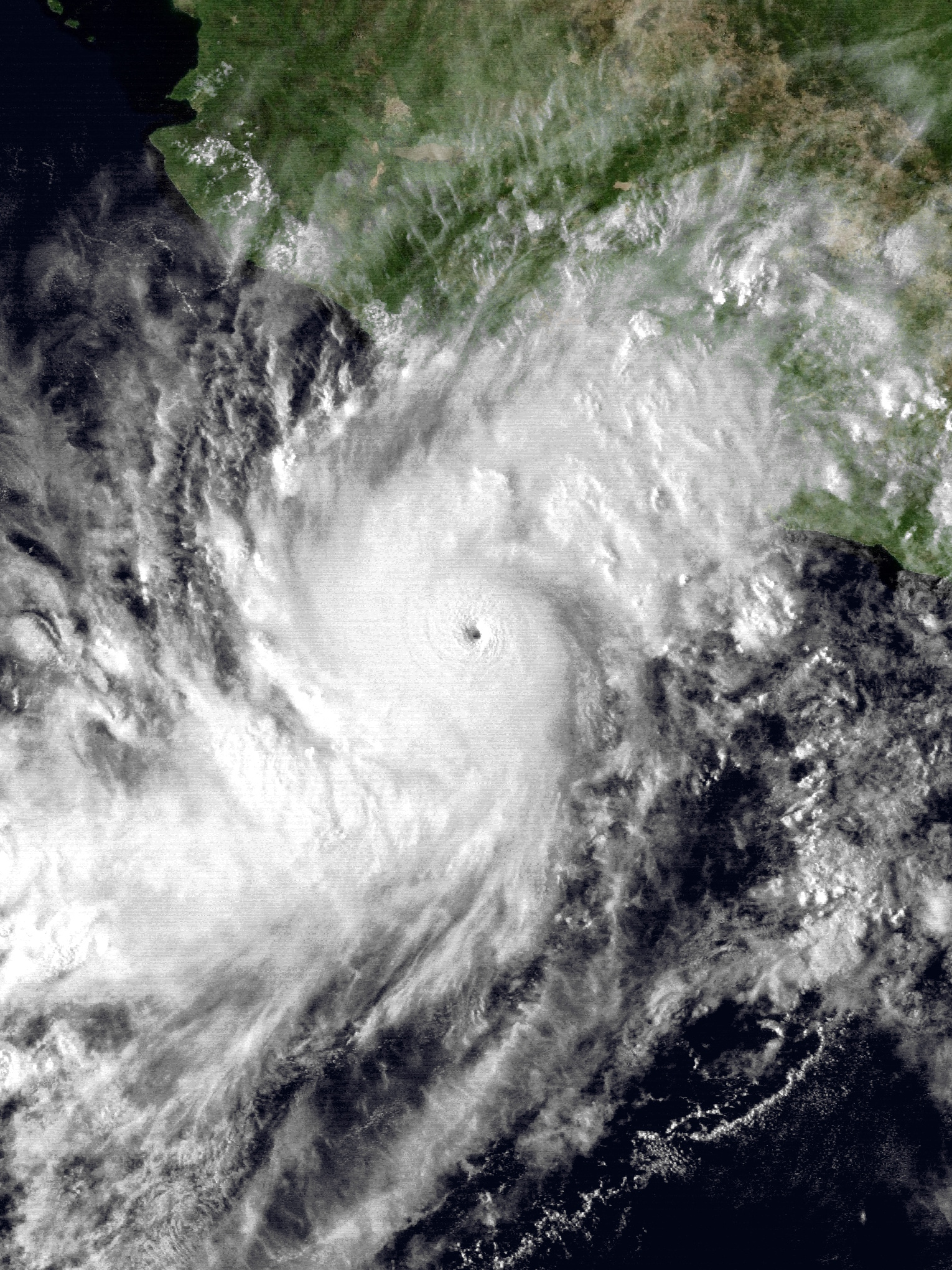
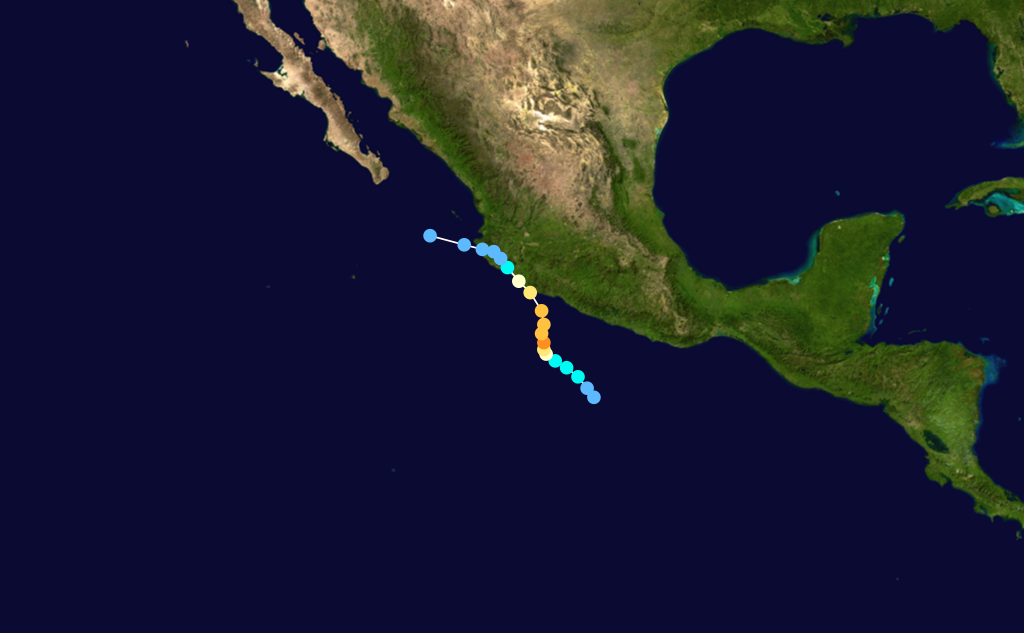
- Duration: October 1 – October 5
- Peak intensity: 130 mph (215 km/h) (1-min); 948 mbar (hPa)

On October 1, a tropical wave organized into Tropical Depression Twenty Three-E, a few hundred miles south of the Mexican coast. Despite weak shearing over the system, it became Tropical Storm Virgil later that day, rapidly intensifying to a hurricane on the October 2, when a distinct and well defined eye appeared on satellite images. Virgil was originally on a slow northwest track, but a mid-upper-level trough turned the hurricane to the north early on October 3. Despite the change in track, the hurricane reached a peak at minimal Category 4 status around the same time that it turned to the north that day. Virgil continued north until early on October 4, when it turned to the northwest and made landfall at high Category 2 strength, halfway between Manzanillo and Lázaro Cárdenas, and after landfall, the system was quickly weakened over the mountainous terrain of Mexico, passing to the north of Manzanillo late on the October 4. Shortly after passing over Manzanillo, it weakened below tropical storm strength, and early on October 5, the weakened Tropical Depression Virgil exited into the Pacific, but no regeneration was expected, as strong westerlies and the weakened state of the system prevented any regeneration, and it dissipated shortly thereafter.

Prior to the arrival of the hurricane, several watches and warnings were issued. During the afternoon of October 2, a hurricane watch was first issued for areas west of Zinhuantatenjo. The next day, the watch was upgraded into a hurricane warning. Fifteen hours later the area east of Zinhuantatenjo, a tropical storm warning was issued. The watches were gradually dropped over the next few days, and by October 4. The NHC warned the possibility of mudslides and landslides and 15 in (380 mm) of rain in the high terrain of Mexico. Due to the sparsely populated area it struck, only minor damage was reported. Heavy rain and flooding were reported, peaking at over 10 inches (25 cm) in one location. One person was reported missing in the state of Colima, and three people were injured in Guerrero. More than 1,000 homes were damaged in Guerrero, Michoacán, and Colima, as was 7,400 acres (30 km^{2}) of farmland. A flood on the Atoyac River washed away 500 homes in Guerrero, which prompted the evacuation of 2,500 people. A passenger train north of Lázaro Cárdenas, Michoacán, was derailed when it encountered washed-out roadbeds. The storm also caused power outages.

=== Hurricane Winifred ===
- Category 3 hurricane (SSHWS)
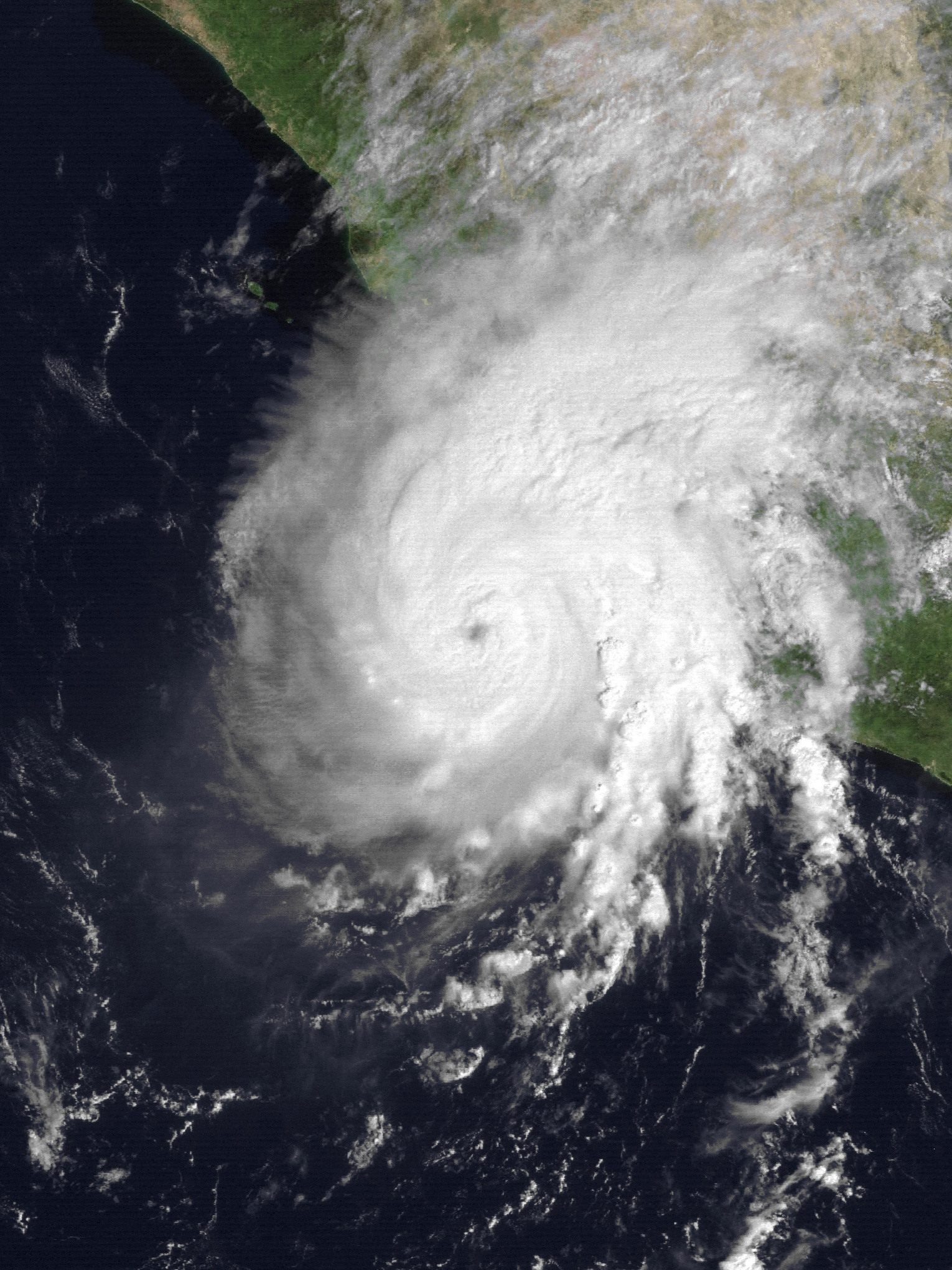
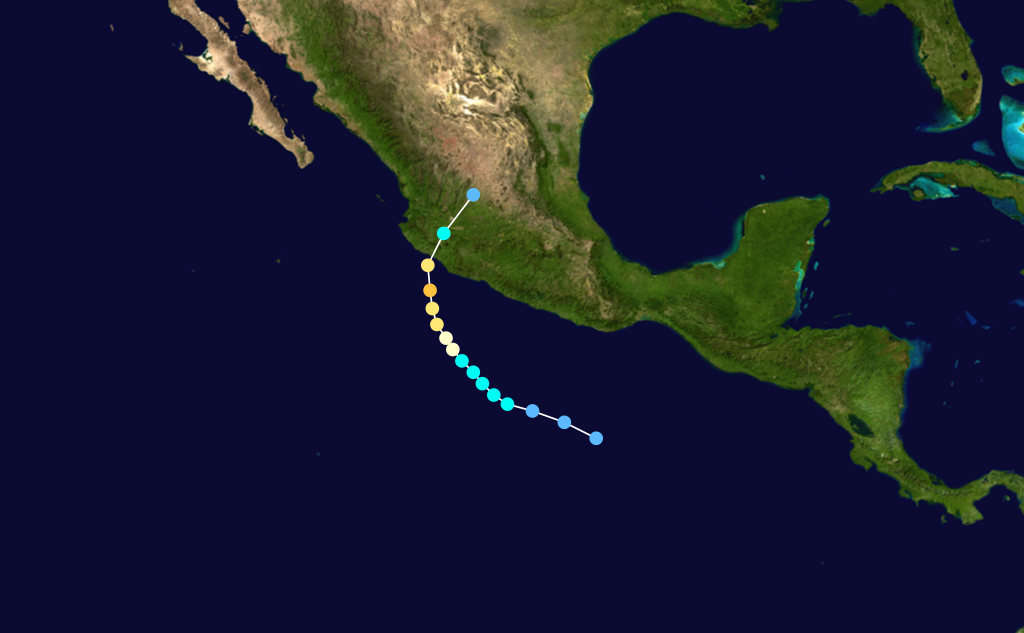
- Duration: October 6 – October 10
- Peak intensity: 115 mph (185 km/h) (1-min); 960 mbar (hPa)

An area of disturbed weather developed into Tropical Depression Twenty Four-E a few hundred miles south of Acapulco. The next day, it was upgraded into Tropical Storm Winifred when satellite imagery showed increased convective banding features around the storm's center. Winifred was upgraded to a hurricane on October 8, subsequently an eye appeared on satellite imagery. Hurricane Winifred peaked at Category 3 status the next day, turning to the north-northeast just hours before landfall. Initially, the storm maintained major hurricane intensity; however, the eye had disappeared hours prior to landfall. Based on this, Winifred weakened into a Category 2 hurricane. On October 9, it made landfall just east-southeast of Manzanillo. At the time it was a weak Category 2 hurricane with winds of 100 mph (160 km/h) and a central pressure of 975 mb (28.8 inHg). After moving ashore, Hurricane Winifred rapidly weakened to a depression over the mountainous terrain of Mexico by October 10, while continuing on a northeast track and finally degenerating to a remnant low later that day.

Three people were killed by floods. Damage was concentrated in Colima and Michoacán. High waves flooded portions of Highway 200 between Zihuatenajo, Ixtapa, and Lázaro Cárdenas. Electricity and water systems was knocked out in Colima. About 84,000 ha (210,000 acres) of farmland were damaged. Total damage in one state was estimated at 16000 pesos (1992 MXP) or $5 million (1992 USD, 11.5 million 2026 USD). The highest point maximum reported was of 16.7 in (420 mm), recorded at Lázaro Cárdenas, Michoacán. Elsewhere, Winifred forced a temporary closure of the port of Acapulco.

=== Tropical Storm Xavier ===
- Tropical storm (SSHWS)
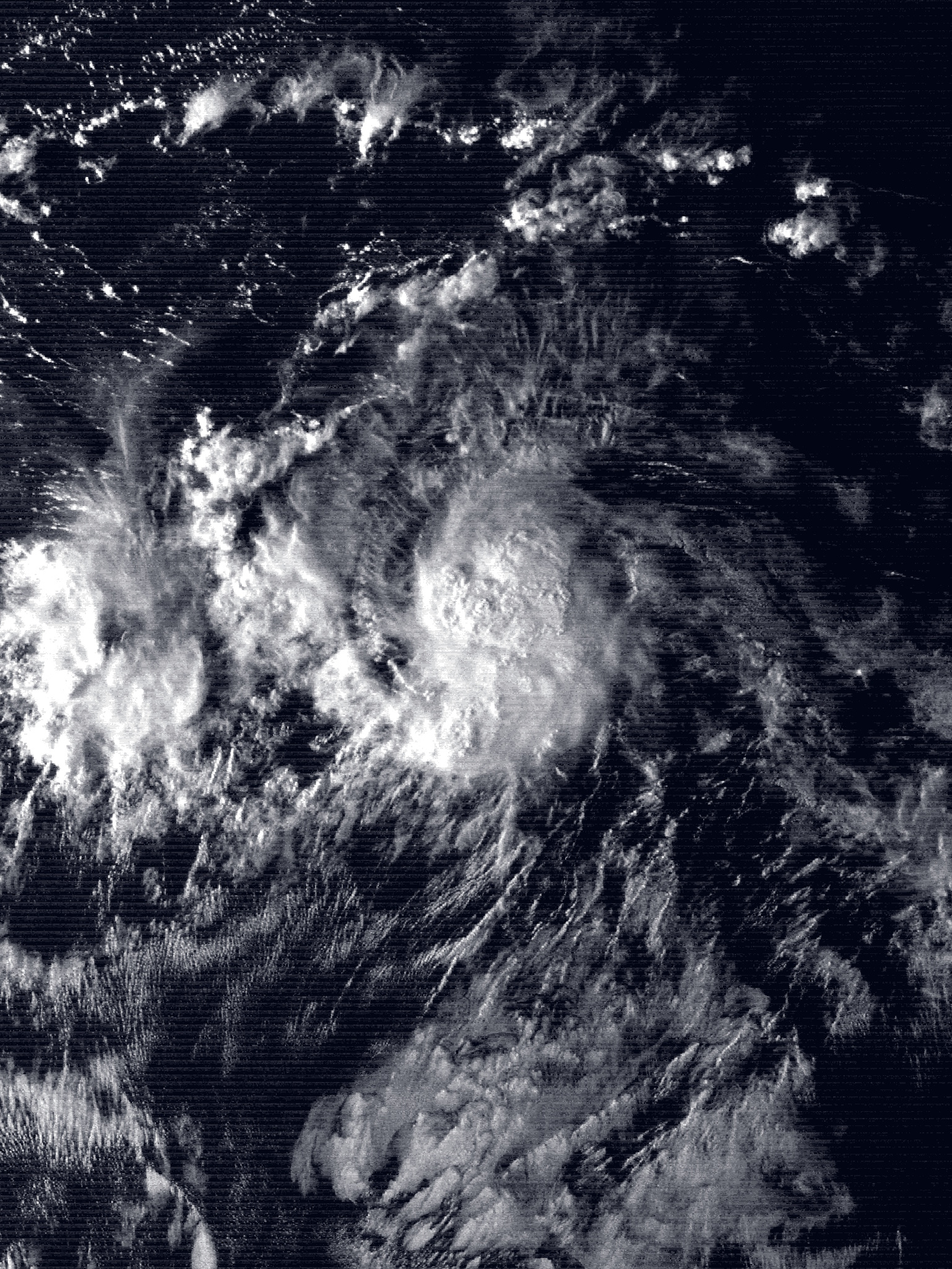
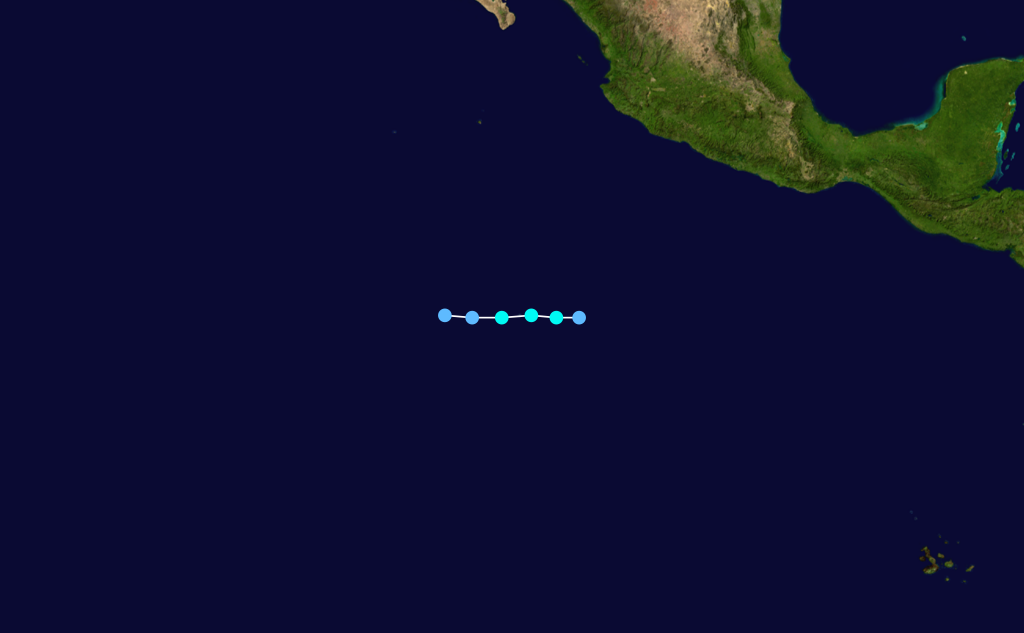
- Duration: October 13 – October 15
- Peak intensity: 45 mph (75 km/h) (1-min); 1003 mbar (hPa)

On October 13, a tropical wave developed a visible low level circulation center, developing into Tropical Depression Twenty Five-E later that day, several hundred miles south of Baja California. The system quickly reached tropical storm status, while moving west. On October 17, Xavier dissipated several hundred miles south of the tip of Baja California. Xavier was only the second tropical system to be named with an 'X' in the eastern Pacific basin, after 1985's Xina.

=== Tropical Storm Yolanda ===
- Tropical storm (SSHWS)
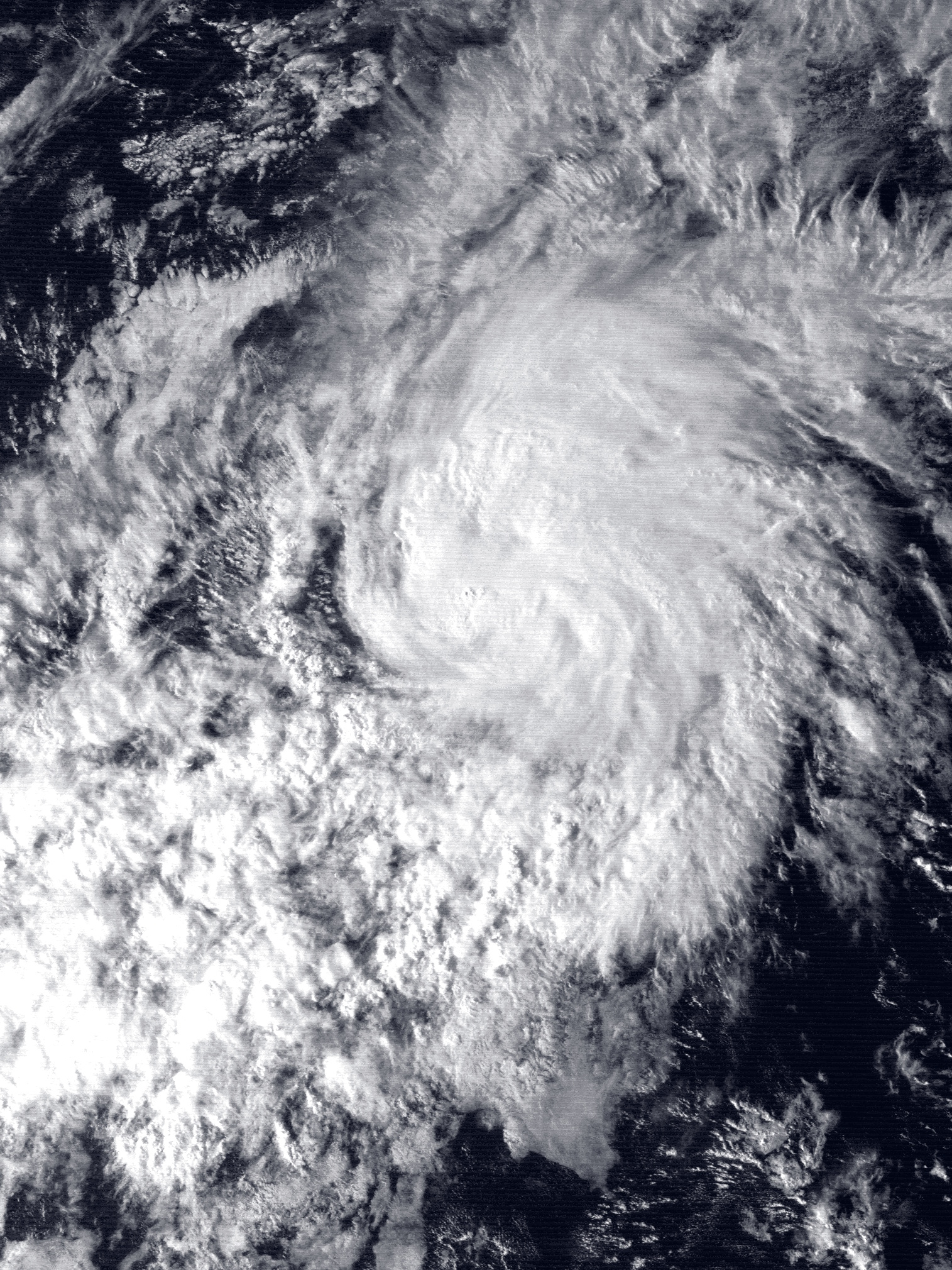
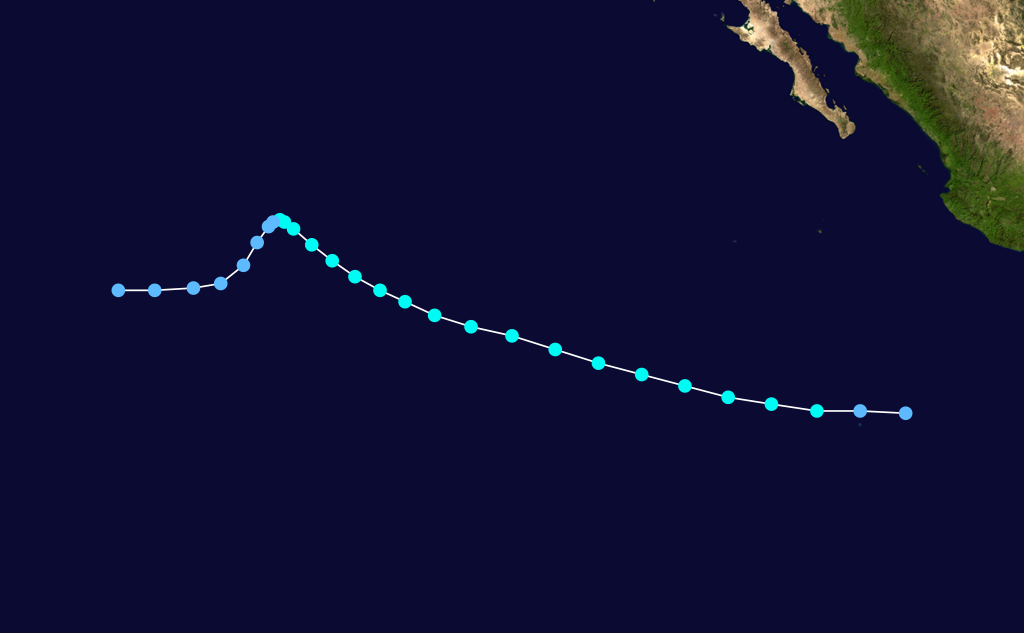
- Duration: October 15 – October 22
- Peak intensity: 65 mph (100 km/h) (1-min); 993 mbar (hPa)

On October 15 a tropical depression formed from the wave several hundred miles south of Manzanillo, and on October 16, it strengthened into Tropical Storm Yolanda. The storm turned to the northwest later that day, and maintained this track for the rest of its lifespan. Yolanda peaked as a strong tropical storm on October 19, but strong southwesterly shear removed all deep convection within the storm's circulation later that day, although there were several occasional flare-ups of convection for the next 12 hours or so. The storm weakened back to a depression the next day, while steering currents moved the weakening depression's center to the southwest, and then finally the west before dissipating in the Central Pacific on the October 22.

=== Tropical Storm Zeke ===
- Tropical storm (SSHWS)
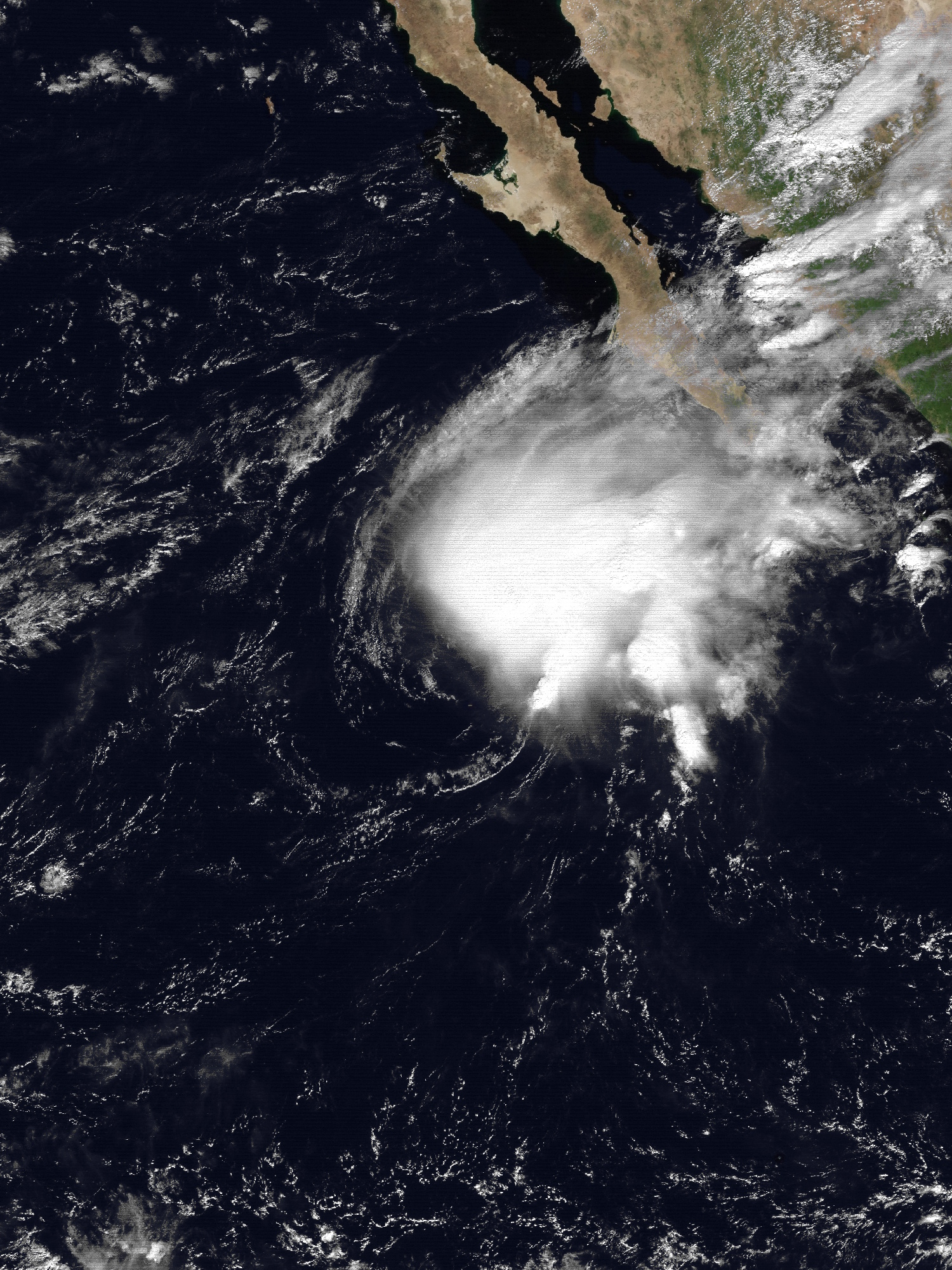
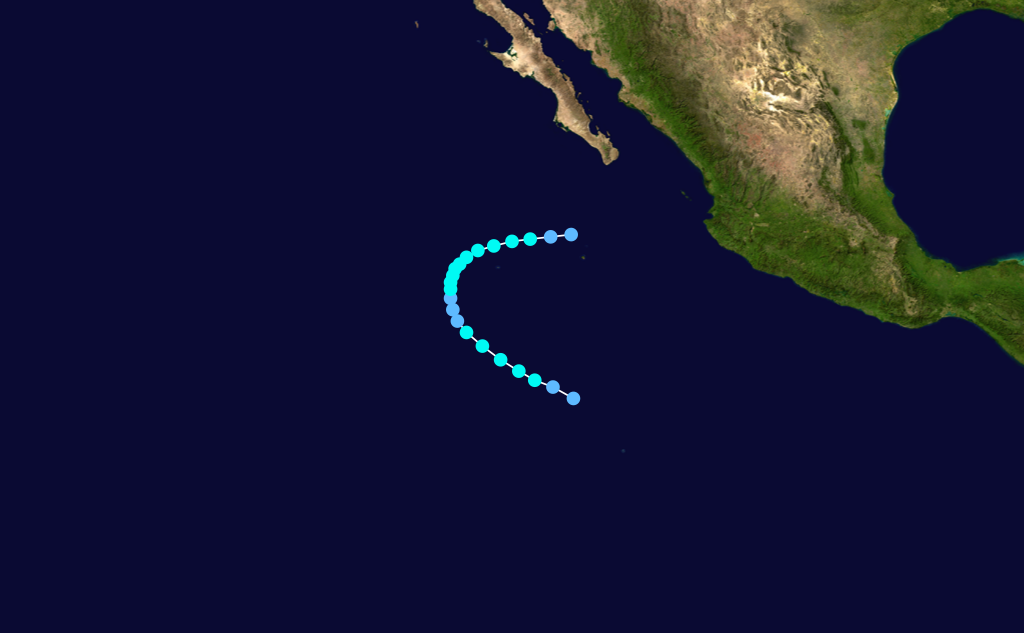
- Duration: October 25 – October 30
- Peak intensity: 50 mph (85 km/h) (1-min); 1000 mbar (hPa)

A tropical wave exited western Africa and eventually crossed Central America into the eastern Pacific between October 21–23. Over the following few days, the system became better organized. On October 25, the NHC classified it as Tropical Depression Twenty-Seven-E, about 805 mi (1,296 km) south of the southern tip of Baja California Sur, Mexico. The depression began moving west-northwest. On October 26, the depression intensified into Tropical Storm Zeke, the record-breaking twenty-fourth named storm of the year. However, wind shear caused Zeke to weaken back to tropical depression status on October 27. Around that time, Zeke turned to the north. The storm re-attained tropical storm intensity on October 28; however, shear over the system remained strong. Despite the unfavorable conditions, Zeke maintained its intensity and began to turn towards the northeast. Late on October 29, the storm attained its peak intensity with winds of 50 mph (80 km/h) with a barometric pressure of 1000 mbar (1000 hPa; 30 inHg). However, Zeke began to weaken once more due to increasing wind shear. By October 30, the system turned eastward and weakened to a tropical depression before degenerating into a remnant low.

Although the center of the storm never moved over land, its outer bands brought heavy rain and gusty winds to Sinaloa and Jalisco.

=== Other systems ===
Tropical Depression Two-E developed during June 16, about 1,700 km (1,055 mi) to the southwest of Mexico City. Over the next few days the system moved north-westwards, but did not develop any further and dissipated on June 18.

On September 24, a tropical disturbance developed within the trade-wind trough of low pressure, just to the east of the International Dateline. Over the next few days the system gradually developed further as it moved north-westwards, before it was classified as Tropical Depression 21W by the JTWC during September 26. The system subsequently moved out of the Central Pacific basin and into the Western Pacific, where it was immediately classified as a tropical storm by both the JTWC and the Japan Meteorological Agency and named Ward by the former.

On October 23, a tropical disturbance developed within the trade-wind trough of low pressure about 830 km (515 mi) to the south of Johnston Island. Over the next day atmospheric convection surrounding the systems low level circulation increased, as it moved towards the International Dateline. During October 24, it was classified as Tropical Depression 27W, by the JTWC in coordination with the CPHC because of its proximity to the Western Pacific basin. 27W subsequently gradually intensified further, before it was classified as a tropical storm and named Dan by the JTWC, just after it had moved into the Western Pacific basin.

In November a small tropical disturbance developed, within a cloud mass over 1,000 km (620 mi) to the southwest of Hawaii's Big Island. Over the next few days, the system moved westwards and developed a closed circulation, before it was designated as Tropical Depression 03C by the CPHC during November 21. The system continued to move westwards over the next 24 hours but did not develop any further and dissipated during November 23.

== Storm names ==
The following list of names was used for named storms that formed in the North Pacific Ocean east of 140°W in 1992. This was the same list used for the 1986 season. The NHC exhausted the naming list on October 25 when it named Tropical Storm Zeke, marking the first time that a storm name beginning with the letter "Z" was used on record in the basin. Zeke also continued the record of named storms in a single season in the eastern Pacific, being the 24th and final tropical storm. Storms were named Seymour, Tina, Virgil, Winifred, Xavier, Yolanda, and Zeke for the first time in 1992. No names were retired from the list following the season, and it was used again for the 1998 season.

- Agatha
- Blas
- Celia
- Darby
- Estelle
- Frank *
- Georgette *
- Howard
- Isis
- Javier *
- Kay
- Lester
- Madeline
- Newton
- Orlene *
- Paine
- Roslyn *
- Seymour
- Tina *
- Virgil
- Winifred
- Xavier
- Yolanda *
- Zeke

For storms that form in the North Pacific from 140°W to the International Date Line, the names come from a series of four rotating lists. Names are used one after the other without regard to year, and when the bottom of one list is reached, the next named storm receives the name at the top of the next list. Three named storms, listed below, formed in the central North Pacific in 1992. Named storms in the table above that crossed into the area during the year are noted (*).

- Ekeka
- Hali
- Iniki

=== Retirement ===
Following the season, the World Meteorological Organization retired the name Iniki from future use in the Central Pacific. It was replaced with Iolana.

== Season effects ==
This is a table of all of the tropical cyclones that formed in the 1992 Pacific hurricane season. It includes their name, duration (within the basin), peak classification and intensities, areas affected, damage, and death totals. Deaths in parentheses are additional and indirect (an example of an indirect death would be a traffic accident), but were still related to that storm. Damage and deaths include totals while the storm was extratropical, a wave, or a low, and all of the damage figures are in 1992 USD.

Saffir–Simpson scale
TD	TS	C1	C2	C3	C4	C5

1992 Pacific tropical cyclone season statistics
Storm name	Dates active	Storm category at peak intensity	Max 1-min wind mph (km/h)	Min. press. (mbar)	Areas affected	Damage (US$)	Deaths	Ref(s).
Ekeka	January 28 – February 3	Category 3 hurricane	115 (185)	982	None (before crossover)	None	None	
Hali	March 28–30	Tropical storm	50 (85)	1004	None	None	None	
Agatha	June 1–5	Tropical storm	70 (110)	990	Southwestern Mexico	None	10	
Two-E	June 16–19	Tropical depression	35 (55)	1009	None	None	None	
Blas	June 22–23	Tropical storm	40 (65)	1004	None	None	None	
Celia	June 22 – July 4	Category 4 hurricane	145 (230)	935	None	None	None	
Darby	July 2–10	Category 3 hurricane	120 (195)	968	California	Minimal	3	
Estelle	July 5–12	Category 4 hurricane	140 (220)	943	None	None	None	
Frank	July 13–23	Category 4 hurricane	145 (230)	935	None	None	None	
Georgette	July 14–26	Category 2 hurricane	110 (175)	964	None	None	None	
Howard	July 26–30	Tropical storm	65 (100)	992	None	None	None	
Isis	July 28 – August 2	Tropical storm	65 (100)	992	None	None	None	
Javier	July 30 – August 12	Category 1 hurricane	80 (130)	985	None	None	None	
Twelve-E	August 10–12	Tropical depression	35 (55)	1008	None	None	None	
Kay	August 18–22	Tropical storm	50 (85)	1000	None	None	None	
Lester	August 20–24	Category 1 hurricane	80 (130)	985	Northwestern Mexico, Southwestern United States, Central United States, Midwestern United States, Mid-Atlantic states	$45 million	3	
Madeline	August 27–30	Tropical storm	50 (85)	999	None	None	None	
Newton	August 27–30	Tropical storm	50 (85)	999	None	None	None	
Orlene	September 2–14	Category 4 hurricane	145 (230)	934	Hawaii	Minimal	None	
Iniki	September 5–13	Category 4 hurricane	145 (230)	938	Hawaii	$3.1 billion	6	
Paine	September 11–16	Category 1 hurricane	75 (120)	987	None	None	None	
Roslyn	September 13–30	Category 2 hurricane	100 (155)	975	None	None	None	
Seymour	September 17–27	Category 1 hurricane	85 (140)	980	None	None	None	
Tina	September 17 – October 11	Category 4 hurricane	150 (240)	932	Western Mexico	None	None	
Virgil	October 1–5	Category 4 hurricane	130 (215)	948	Southwestern Mexico	Minimal	None	
Winifred	October 6–10	Category 3 hurricane	115 (185)	960	Western Mexico	$5 million	3	
Xavier	October 13–15	Tropical storm	45 (75)	1003	None	None	None	
Yolanda	October 15–22	Tropical storm	65 (100)	993	None	None	None	
Zeke	October 25–30	Tropical storm	50 (85)	999	Western Mexico	None	None	
Three-C	November 22–23	Tropical depression	35 (55)	1008	None	None	None	
Season aggregates
30 systems	January 28 – November 23		150 (240)	932		$3.15 billion	25	

== See also ==
- List of Pacific hurricanes
- Pacific hurricane season
- 1992 Atlantic hurricane season
- 1992 Pacific typhoon season
- 1992 North Indian Ocean cyclone season
- South-West Indian Ocean cyclone season: 1991–92, 1992–93
- Australian region cyclone season: 1991–92, 1992–93
- South Pacific cyclone season: 1991–92, 1992–93
