= List of Pacific hurricane records =

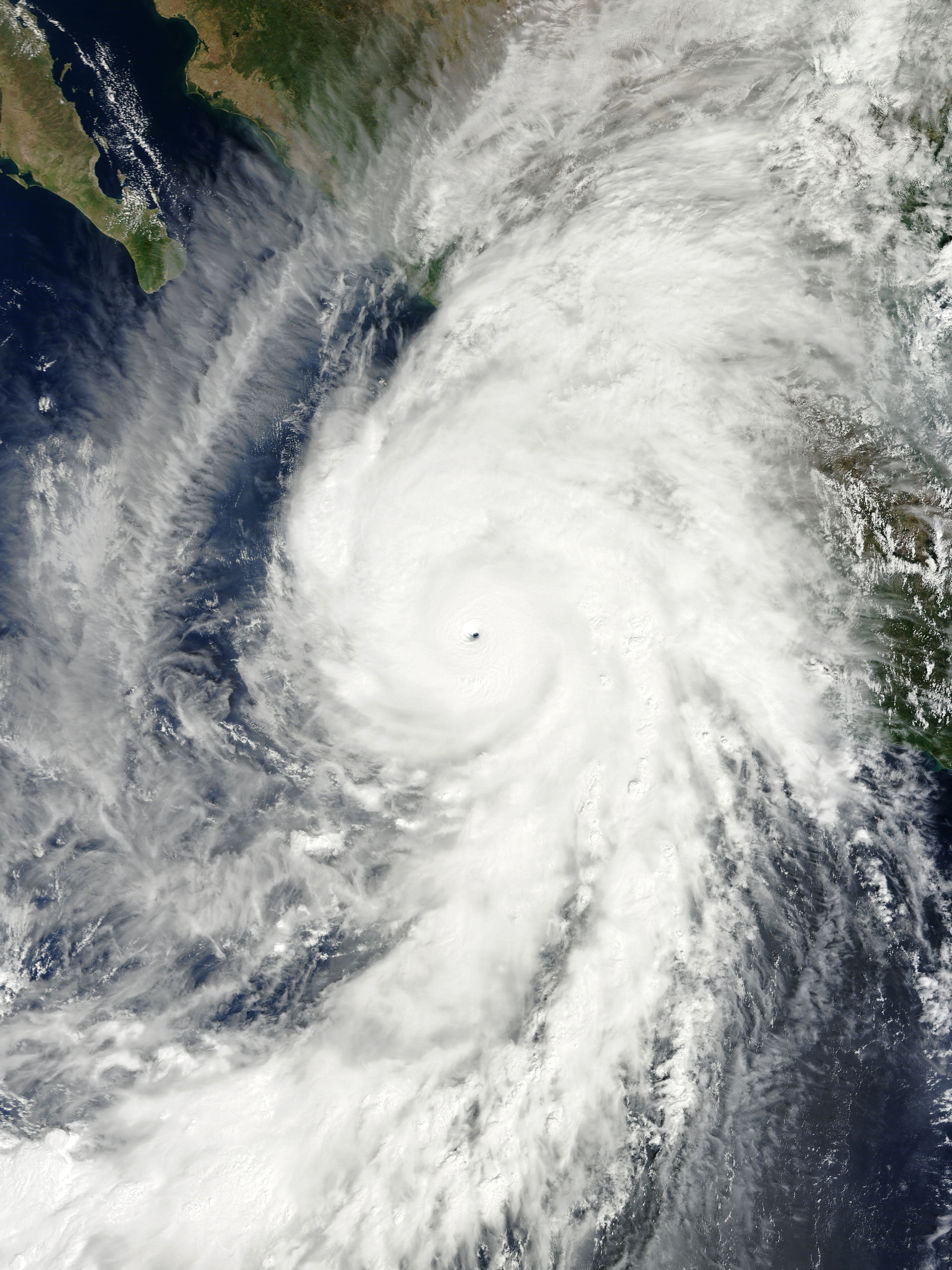
Hurricane Patricia shortly after reaching its record peak intensity on October 23, 2015, while approaching Western Mexico

This is a list of notable Pacific hurricanes, subdivided by reason for notability. Notability means that it has met some criterion or achieved some statistic, or is part of a top ten for some superlative. It includes lists and rankings of Pacific hurricanes by different characteristics and impacts.

Characteristics include extremes of location, such as the northernmost or most equator-ward formation or position of a tropical cyclone. Other characteristics include its central pressure, windspeed, category on the Saffir–Simpson scale, cyclogenesis outside of a normal hurricane season's timeframe, or storms that remain unnamed despite forming after tropical cyclone naming began in 1960. Another characteristic is how long a system lasted from formation to dissipation. These include the cost of damage, the number of casualties, as well as meteorological statistics such as rainfall point maximum, wind speed, and minimum pressure.

== Impact ==
=== Retired names ===
The following names have been retired in the East Pacific (in chronological order): Hazel, Adele, Fico, Knut, Iva, Fefa, Ismael, Pauline, Adolph, Israel, Kenna, Alma, Manuel, Odile, Isis, Patricia, Dora, Otis, and John.

In addition, the following names have been retired in the Central Pacific (in chronological order): Iwa, Iniki, Paka, and Ioke.

From the lists above, the names Hazel and Adele were retired for unclear reasons. Also, the names Adolph, Israel, and Isis were retired because of political considerations. In particular, the name Isis was pre-emptively removed in 2015 from the list of names for 2016 after being deemed inappropriate because of the eponymous militant group.

=== Historically significant tropical cyclones, pre 1960 ===
Name	Year	Notes
"San Diego hurricane"	1858	Strongest tropical cyclone to affect California
Unnamed storm	1871	First and one of only three known hurricanes to make landfall on the Hawaiian Islands.
"California tropical storm"	1939	Only known modern landfall in California
"Cabo San Lucas hurricane"	1941	Deadliest hurricane to hit Cabo San Lucas in the 20th century
"Mazatlán hurricane"	1943	One of the strongest hurricanes to hit Mazatlán
"Texas hurricane"	1949	Most intense Pacific-Atlantic crossover
Hurricane Twelve	1957	Third-strongest Mexico landfall
"Mexico hurricane"	1959	Deadliest Pacific hurricane

=== Deadliest tropical cyclones ===
Known Pacific hurricanes that have killed at least 100 people
Hurricane	Season	Fatalities	Ref.
"Mexico"	1959	1,800	
Paul	1982	1,625	
Liza	1976	1,263	
Tara	1961	436	
Pauline	1997	230–400	
Agatha	2010	204	
Manuel	2013	169	
Tico	1983	141	
Ismael	1995	116	
"Lower California"	1931	110	
"Mazatlán"	1943	100	
Lidia	1981	100	

=== Costliest tropical cyclones ===
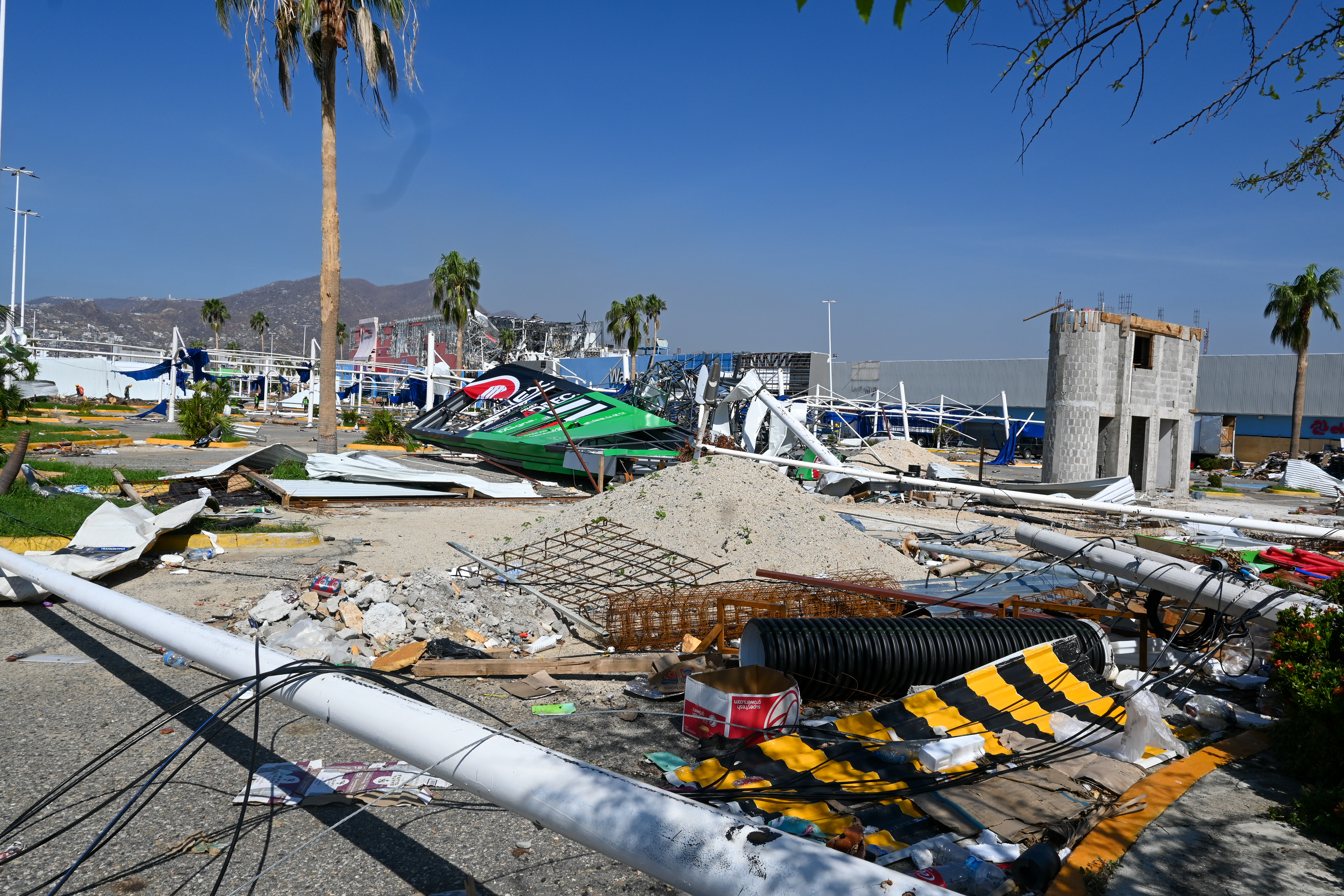
Damages from Hurricane Otis

Tropical cyclones listed here are listed with the value from the source providing the highest value. Due to source variation and inconsistency, some sources may state damage totals lower than what is listed.

Costliest Pacific hurricanes
Rank	Cyclone	Season	Damage	Ref
1	5 Otis	2023	$12–16 billion	
2	1 Manuel	2013	$4.2 billion	
3	4 Iniki	1992	$3.1 billion	
4	3 John	2024	$2.45 billion	
5	4 Odile	2014	$1.82 billion	
6	TS Agatha	2010	$1.1 billion	
7	4 Hilary	2023	$948 million	
8	5 Willa	2018	$825 million	
9	1 Madeline	1998	$750 million	
10	2 Rosa	1994	$700 million	

== Seasonal activity and records ==
In the Central Pacific Hurricane Center's (CPHC) area of responsibility (AOR), the season with the most tropical cyclones is the 2015 season with 16 cyclones forming in or entering the region. A season without cyclones has happened a few times since 1966, most recently in 1979.

=== Highest ===
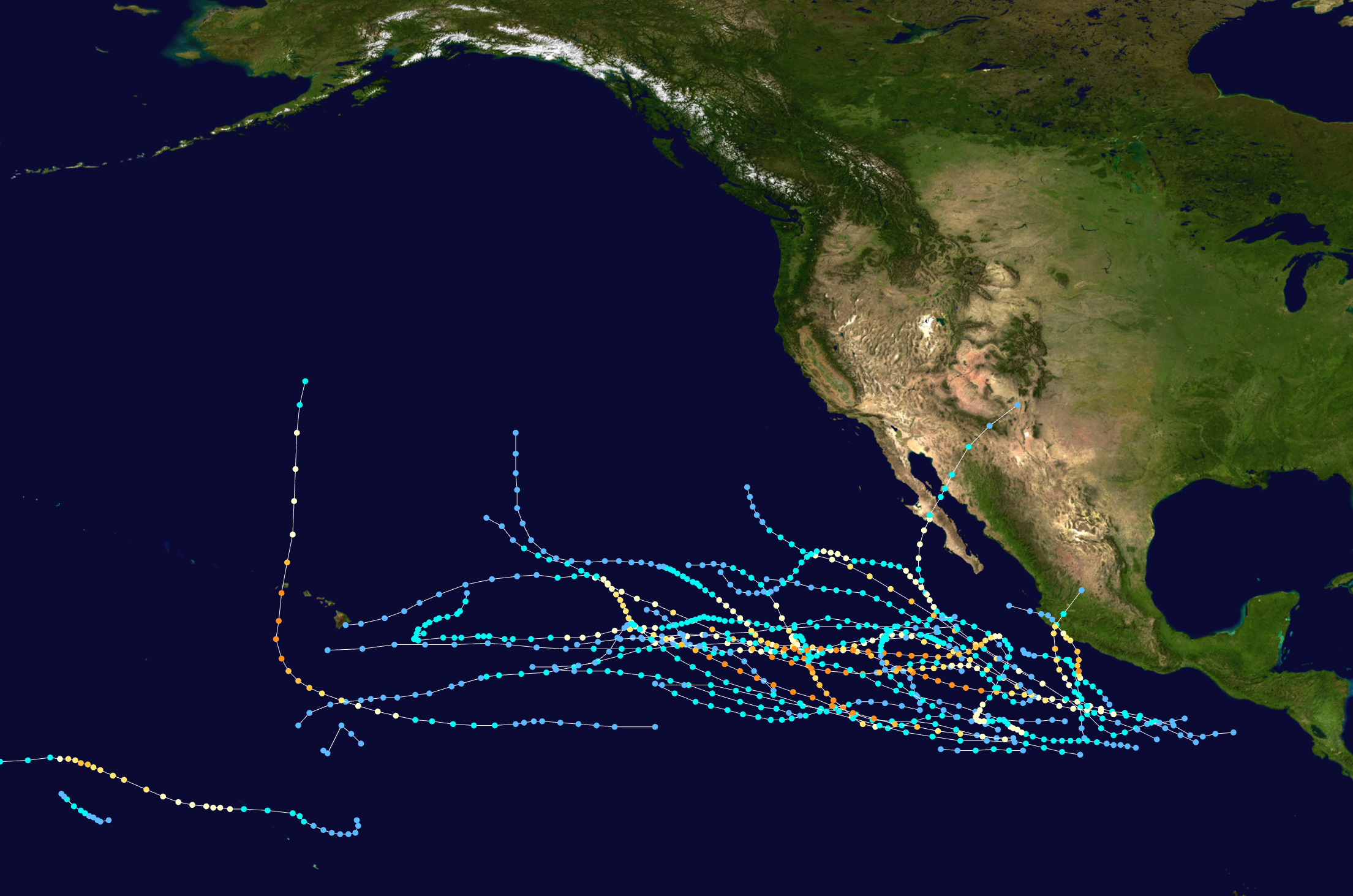
Track map of the 1992 Pacific hurricane season, the busiest ever recorded

Year	NHC's AOR			CPHC's AOR			Total		
Year	Tropical storms	Hurricanes	Major hurricanes	Tropical storms	Hurricanes	Major hurricanes	Tropical storms	Hurricanes	Major hurricanes
1992 season	24	14	8	3	2	2	27	16	10
2015 season	18	13	10	8	3	1	26	16	11
2026 season	20	10	9	5	2	2	25	13	11
1985 season	22	12	8	2	2	0	24	14	8
2018 season	22	12	9	1	1	1	23	13	10
1982 season	19	11	5	4	1	0	23	12	5
2014 season	20	15	7	2	1	2	22	16	9
2016 season	20	12	5	2	2	1	22	13	6
1984 season	18	12	6	3	1	1	21	13	7
1983 season	21	12	8	0	0	0	21	12	8
1990 season	20	16	6	1	0	0	21	16	6

=== Lowest ===
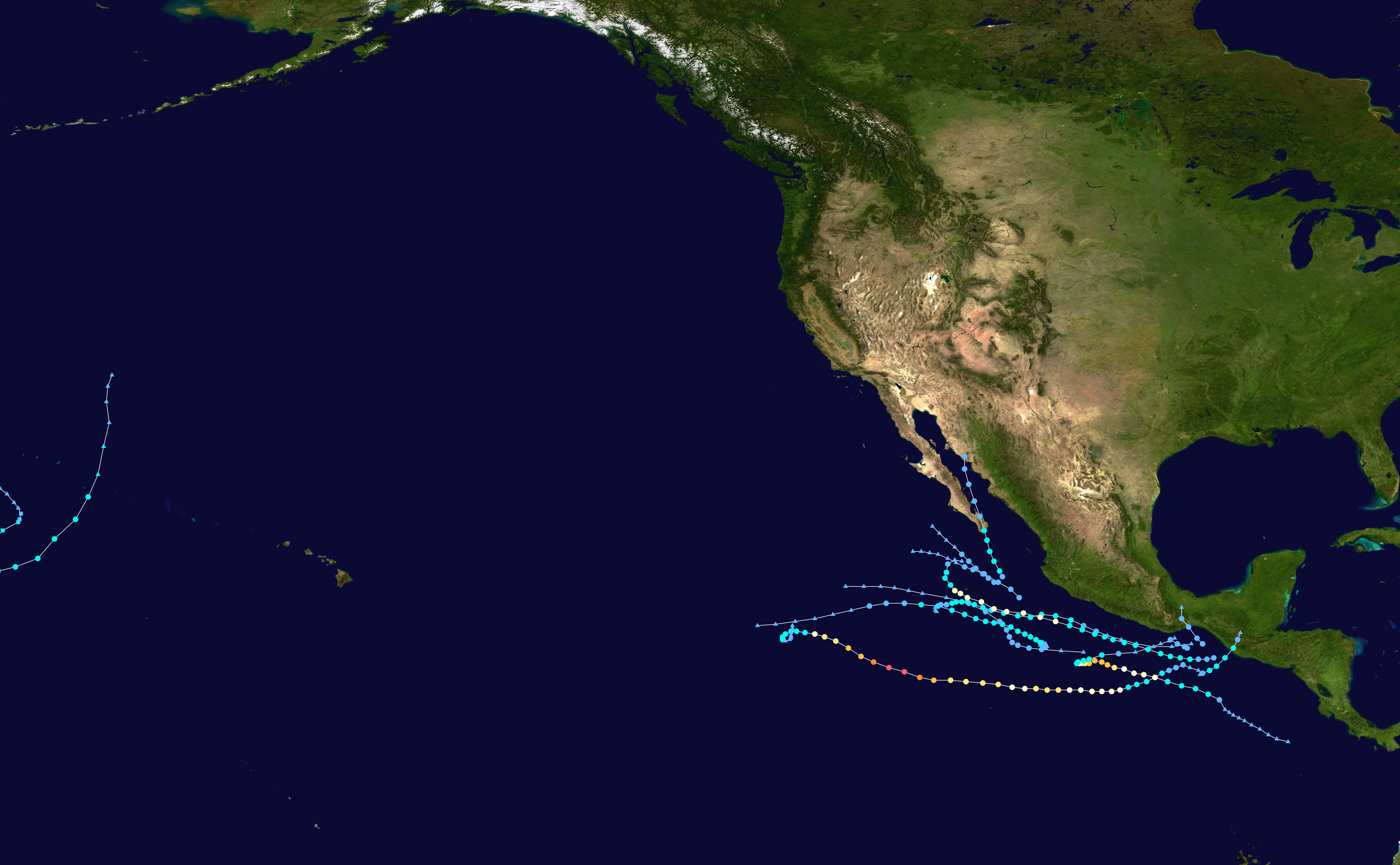
Track map of the 2010 Pacific hurricane season, the lowest ever recorded

Before 1971 and especially 1966, data in this basin is extremely unreliable. The geostationary satellite era began in 1966, and that year is often considered the first year of reliable tropical records. Intensity estimates are most reliable starting in the 1971 season. A few years later, the Dvorak technique came into use. Those two factors make intensity estimates more reliable starting in that year. For these reasons, seasons prior to 1971 are not included.

Year	NHC's AOR			CPHC's AOR			Total		
Year	Tropical storms	Hurricanes	Major hurricanes	Tropical storms	Hurricanes	Major hurricanes	Tropical storms	Hurricanes	Major hurricanes
2010 season	7	3	2	1	0	0	8	3	2
1977 season	8	4	0	0	0	0	8	4	0
1996 season	9	5	2	0	0	0	9	5	2
1999 season	9	6	2	0	0	0	9	6	2
1995 season	10	7	3	0	0	0	10	7	3
1979 season	10	6	4	0	0	0	10	6	4

=== Earliest storm formation by number ===
Earliest and next earliest forming Pacific tropical / subtropical storms by storm number
Storm number	Earliest		Next earliest	
Storm number	Name	Date of formation	Name	Date of formation
1	Pali	January 7, 2016	Winona	January 13, 1989
2	Hali	March 29, 1992	Bud	May 22, 2012
3	Agatha	June 2, 1992	Cristina (Note: Both Tropical Storm Cosme in 2025 and Cristina in 2026, the 3rd named storm of their seasons, became tropical storms on June 8. However, Cristina did so at 0600 UTC, whereas Cosme did so at 1200 UTC.)	June 8, 2026
4	Four	June 12, 1956	Dalila	June 13, 2025
5	Erick	June 17, 2025	Celia	June 23, 1992
6	Flossie	June 29, 2025	Fabio	July 1, 2018
7	Genevieve	July 7, 1984	Guillermo	July 8, 1985
8	Enrique	July 13, 2015	Frank	July 14, 1992
9	Georgette	July 15, 1992	Ignacio (Note: Both Hurricane Ignacio in 1985 and Hurricane Iselle in 1990, the 9th named storm of their seasons, became tropical storms on July 21. However, Ignacio did so at 0600 UTC, whereas Iselle did so at 1200 UTC.)	July 21, 1985
10	Jimena	July 21, 1985	Howard	July 27, 1992
11	Isis	July 28, 1992	Kevin	July 29, 1985
12	Linda	July 31, 1985	Javier	August 2, 1992
13	Marty	August 7, 1985	Lowell	August 18, 2014
14	Lester	August 20, 1992	Nora	August 21, 1985
15	Olaf	August 24, 1985	Jimena	August 27, 2015
16	Newton	August 28, 1992	Pauline (Note: Both Pauline and Skip became tropical storms at 0000 UTC on August 31, 1985.)	August 31, 1985
17	Skip	August 31, 1985	Orlene	September 3, 1992
18	Rick	September 2, 1985	Iniki	September 8, 1992
19	Sandra	September 7, 1985	Paine	September 11, 1992
20	Roslyn	September 14, 1992	Terry	September 16, 1985
21	Seymour	September 18, 1992 (Note: Although Seymour and Tina both became tropical storms on September 18, 1992, Seymour did so at 0000 UTC, whereas Tina did so at 1800 UTC.)	Vivian	September 20, 1985
22	Tina	September 18, 1992	Waldo	October 7, 1985
23	Virgil	October 1, 1992	Olaf	October 17, 2015
24	Winifred	October 7, 1992	Patricia	October 21, 2015
25	Xavier	October 14, 1992	Pena	November 6, 2026
26	Yolanda	October 16, 1992	Sandra	November 24, 2015
27	Zeke	October 26, 1992	Earliest formation by virtue of being the only of that number	

=== Naming history ===
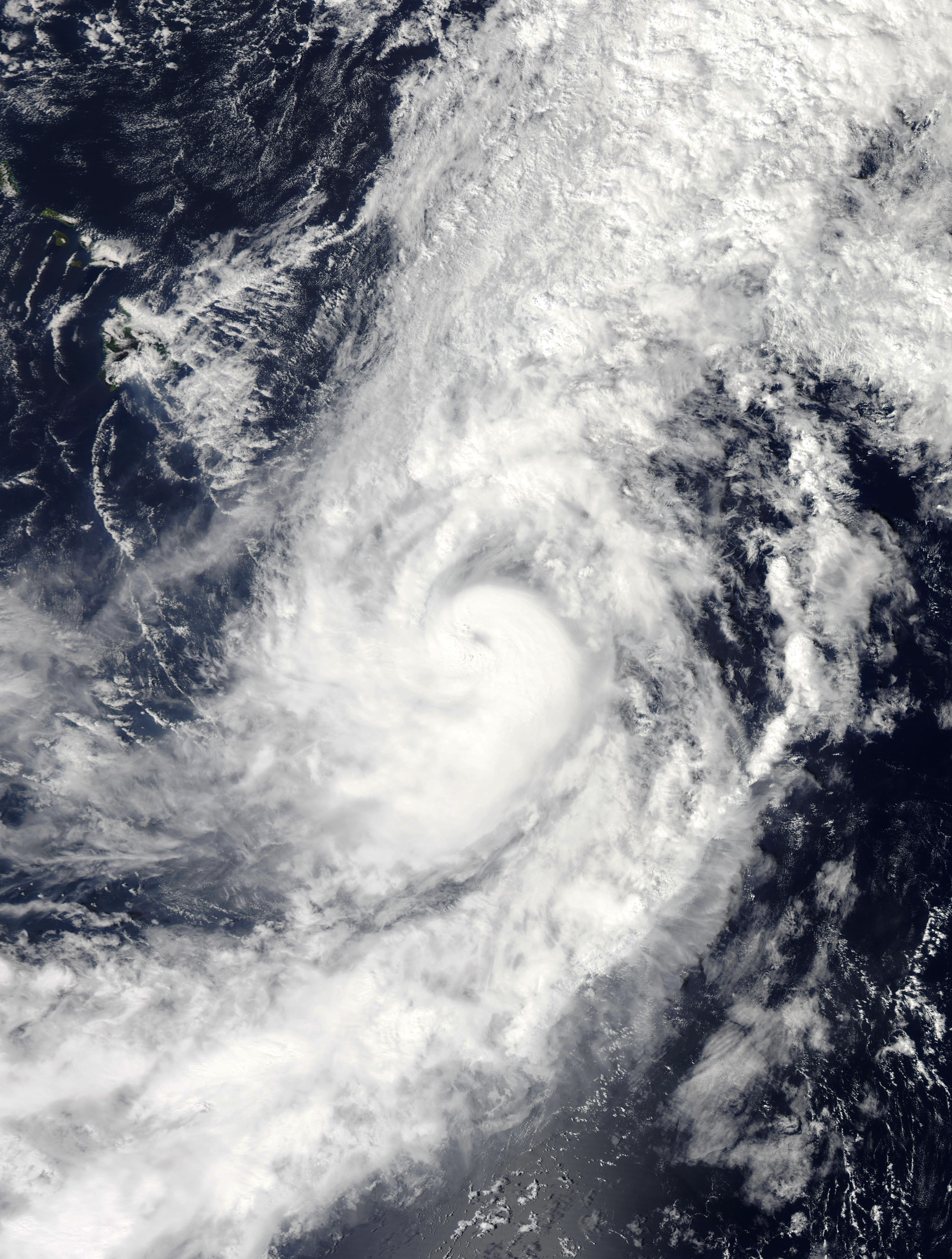
Hurricane Oho, the eighth system to receive a central Pacific name in 2015

Naming of tropical cyclones in the eastern north Pacific began in the 1960 season. That year, four lists of names were created. The plan was to proceed in a manner similar to that of the western Pacific; that is, the name of the first storm in one season would be the next unused one from the same list, and when the bottom of one list was reached the next list was started. This scheme was abandoned in 1965 and next year, the lists started being recycled on a four-year rotation, starting with the A name each year. That same general scheme remains in use today, although the names and lists are different. On average, the eastern north Pacific sees about sixteen named storms per year.

=== Named storms per month ===
Four of the July cyclones during the 2016 season

Specific seasonal data in the Eastern Pacific basin was first compiled in 1949. Therefore, seasons before 1949 are excluded from the "Most named" column.

Also, before 1971 and especially 1966, data in this basin is extremely unreliable. The geostationary satellite era began in 1966, and that year is often considered the first year of reliable tropical records. Intensity estimates are more reliable starting in the 1971 season. A few years later, the Dvorak technique came into use. Those two make intensity estimates more reliable starting in that year. For these reasons, seasons before 1971 are not included in the "Fewest named" column.

Month	Most named		Fewest named	
Month	Number	Seasons	Number	Seasons
Preseason	2	1992	0	>5
Late May	2	1956; 1984; 2007; 2012; 2013	0	>5
June	5	1985; 2018; 2025	0	2004; 2006; 2007; 2016; 2024
July	7	1985; 2015; 2016	0	2010
August	9	1968	0	1996
September	6	>5 (Note: 1957, 1966, 1992, 1994, 1997, 2001, 2005, 2019, and 2026)	1	1979; 2010; 2011; 2021
October	5	1992; 2023	0	1989; 1995; 1996; 2005; 2010
November	2	>5 (Note: 1972, 2006, 2015, 2016, 2020, and 2021)	0	>5
Postseason	1	1983; 1997; 2010	0	>5

== Off-season storms ==
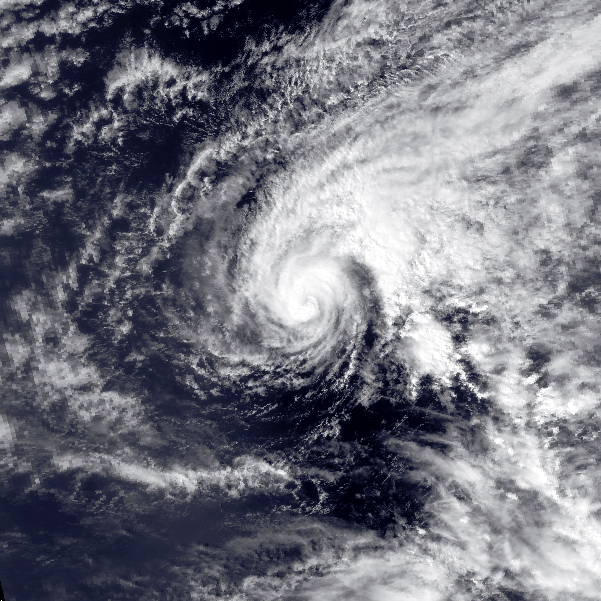
A meteorological enigma, Hurricane Ekeka formed in January and became a major hurricane.

The Pacific hurricane season runs from May 15 to November 30. Only systems that develop or enter during the off-season are included. The earliest off-season storm is Pali in 2016 whilst the latest off-season storm was Nine-C during 2015.

Name	Formation date	Ref.
Unnamed	December 1832	
"Froc Cyclone"	December 23, 1902	
"Hurd Cyclone"	December 23, 1904	
Unnamed	May 3, 1906	
Unnamed	February 6, 1922	
Nine	December 22, 1925	
Eight	December 4, 1936	
Carmen	April 4, 1980†	
Winnie	December 4, 1983	
Winona	January 9, 1989	
Alma	May 12, 1990	
Ekeka	January 26, 1992	
Hali	March 28, 1992	
One-E	May 13, 1996	
Omeka	December 20, 2010	
Aletta	May 14, 2012	
Nine-C	December 31, 2015	
Pali	January 7, 2016	
Adrian	May 9, 2017	
One-E	May 10, 2018	
One-E	April 25, 2020	
Andres	May 9, 2021	

†Entered the basin on this date

== Unnamed storms ==
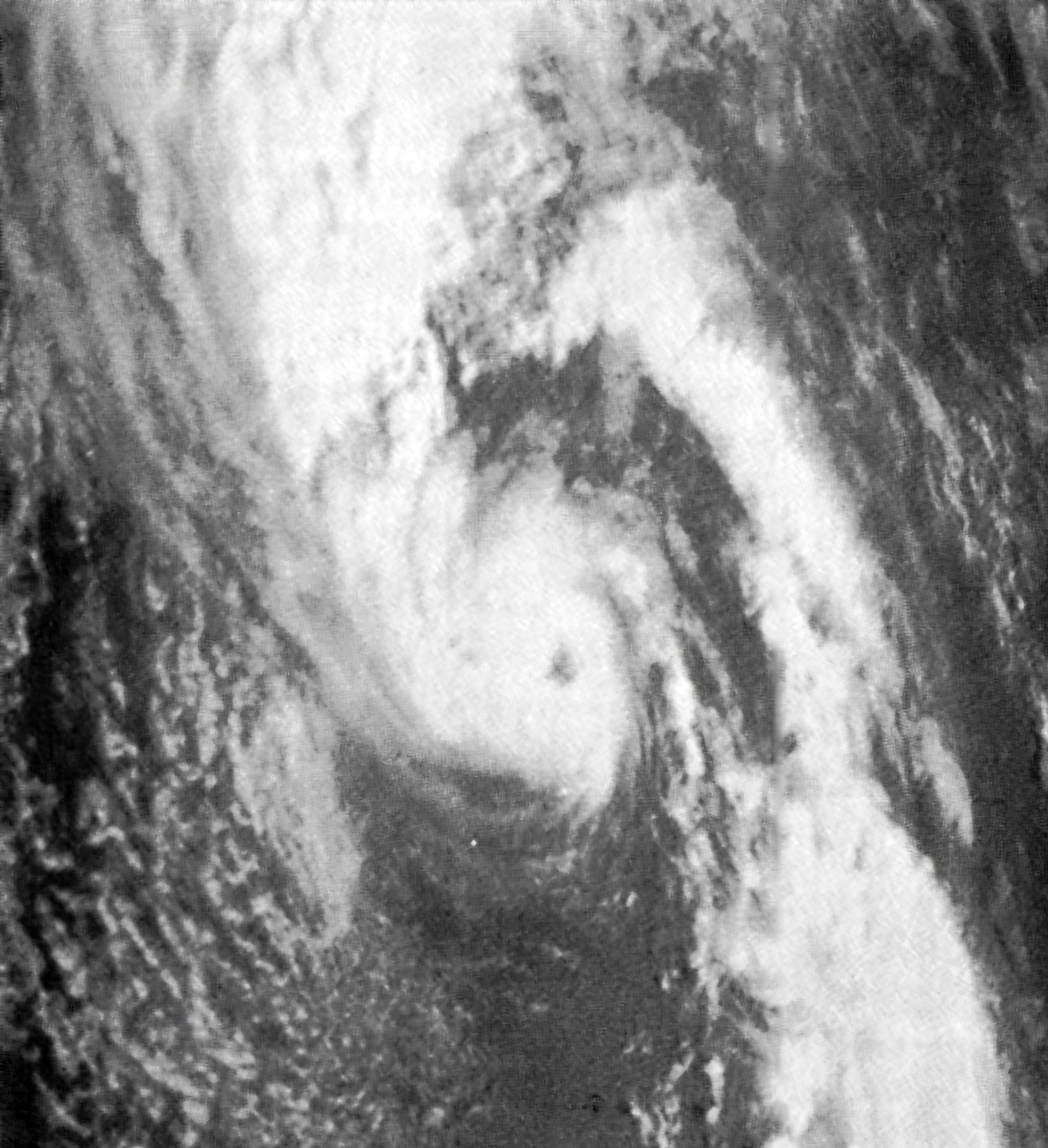
The unnamed hurricane of 1975 near the Pacific Northwest

Tropical cyclones have received official names in the Eastern and Central Pacific beginning in 1960. Since then, 6 tropical storms or hurricanes have formed that did not receive a storm name. (Note: The "2006 Central Pacific cyclone" is excluded, as its status has never been officially determined.)

- Tropical Storm 4 (1962)
- Tropical Storm 8 (1962)
- Tropical Storm Four (1963)
- "1975 Pacific Northwest hurricane"
- Unnamed tropical storm (1996)
- Unnamed tropical storm (2020)
- Unnamed tropical storm (2024)

== Strength ==
=== Category 5 ===
Since 1959, 24 Pacific hurricanes have attained Category 5 intensity. The only one to make landfall while at this intensity was Otis in 2023.

=== Category 4 ===
Since 1900, 141 Pacific hurricanes have attained Category 4 intensity, of which five made landfall at that strength.

=== Category 3 ===
Since 1970, 86 Pacific hurricanes have attained Category 3 intensity, of which three made landfall at that strength.

== Duration records ==
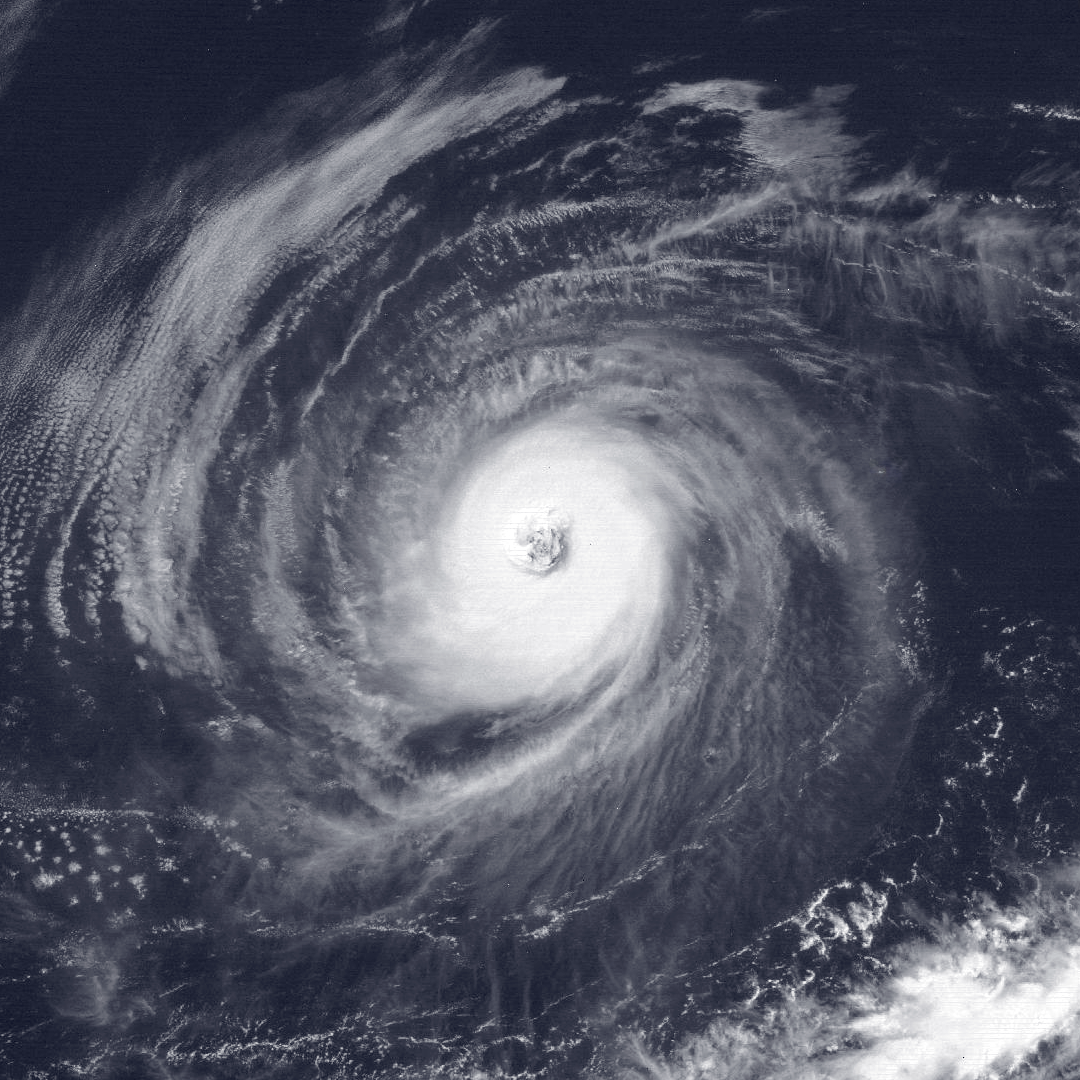
Hurricane Tina, the longest-lasting Pacific hurricane east of the International Date Line

This lists all Pacific hurricanes that existed as tropical cyclones while in the Pacific Ocean east of the dateline for more than two weeks continuously. Hurricanes John and Dora spent some time in the west Pacific before dissipating. John spent eleven days west of the dateline; if that time was included John would have existed for a total of 30 days and 18 hours, while including Dora's time in the west Pacific would mean that it existed for 18 days. One Atlantic hurricane, Hurricane Joan, crossed into this basin and was renamed Miriam, giving it a total lifespan of 22 days, but not all of that was in the Pacific. 1993's Greg formed from the remnants of Tropical Storm Bret (1993). Its time as an Atlantic system is excluded.

All of these systems except Trudy, Olaf, Connie and Lala existed in both the east and central Pacific, and all except Olaf were hurricanes. Hurricane Trudy of 1990 is thus the longest lived eastern Pacific hurricane to stay in the eastern Pacific. Tropical Storm Olaf of 1997 is hence the longest-lived eastern Pacific tropical cyclone not to reach hurricane intensity.

Prior to Hurricane Lala, no known tropical cyclone forming in the central north Pacific lasted for longer than 14 days without crossing into another basin. The pre-2026 tropical cyclone that formed in the central Pacific and spent the most time there was Hurricane Ana, at 12.75 days from formation to extratropical transition.

Rank	Duration (days)	Name	Season
1	24.50	Tina	1992
2	20.00	Fico	1978
3	19.00	John	1994
4	17.50	Kevin	1991
5	16.75	Trudy	1990
6	16.50	Guillermo	1997
6	16.50	Olaf	1997
8	16.25	Celeste	1972
8	16.25	Doreen	1973
8	16.25	Kenneth	2005
11	16.00	Daniel	1982
12	15.25	Connie	1974
13	14.50	Jimena	2015
13	14.50	Darby	2016
13	14.50	Lala	2026
16	14.25	Lowell	2026
17	14.00	Marie	1990
17	14.00	Greg	1993
17	14.00	Dora	1999
17	14.00	Lane	2018
17	14.00	Olivia	2018

Before the weather satellite era began, the lifespans of many Pacific hurricanes may be underestimated.

== Crossover storms ==
=== From Atlantic to Eastern Pacific ===
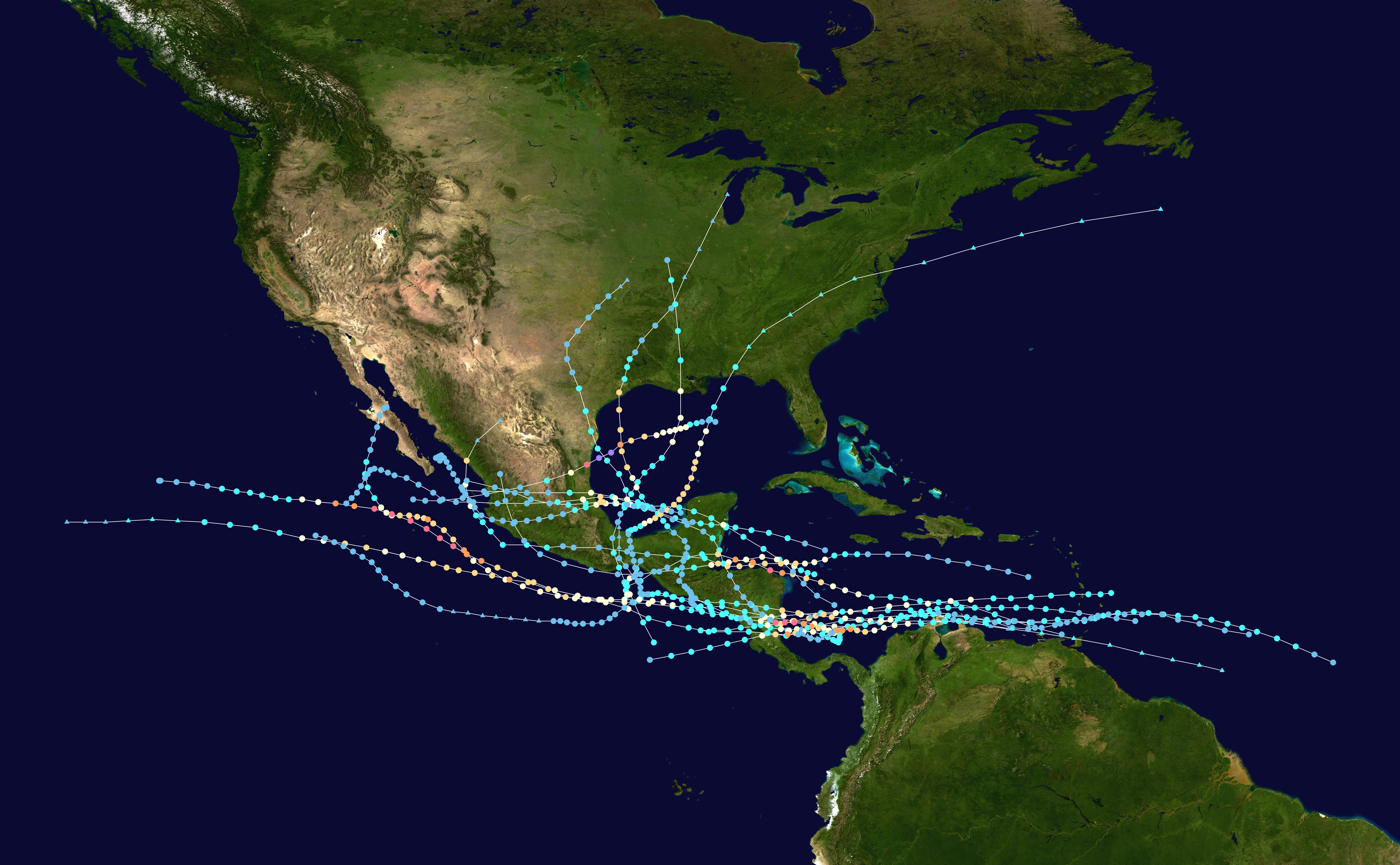
Tracks of Atlantic-Pacific crossovers on both directions

This includes only systems which stayed a tropical cyclone during the passage or that maintained a circulation during the crossover.

Season	Storm (Atlantic)	Storm (Pacific)	Ref.
1876	Four	Unnamed	
1911	Four	Unnumbered tropical depression	
1945	Ten	Unnumbered tropical depression	
1971	Irene	Olivia	
1977	Anita	Eleven-E	
1978	Greta	Olivia	
1988	Debby	Seventeen-E	
1988	Joan	Miriam	
1990	Diana	Unnumbered tropical depression	
1993	Gert	Fourteen-E	
1996	Cesar	Douglas	
1996	Dolly	Unnumbered tropical depression	
2016	Otto		
2022	Bonnie		
2022	Julia		

It used to be that when a Pacific named storm crossed North America and made it to the Atlantic (or vice versa), it would receive the next name on the respective basin's list. However, in 2000 this policy was changed so that a tropical cyclone will keep its name if it remains a tropical cyclone during the entire passage. Only if it dissipates and then re-forms does it get renamed.

=== From Eastern Pacific to Atlantic ===
This includes only systems which stayed a tropical cyclone during the passage or that maintained a circulation during the crossover.

Season	Storm (Pacific)	Storm (Atlantic)	Ref.
1842	Unnamed	Unnamed	
1902	Unnumbered tropical depression	Four	
1923	Unnamed	Six	
1949	Unnumbered tropical depression	Eleven	
2010	Eleven-E	Hermine	

=== From Eastern Pacific to Western Pacific ===
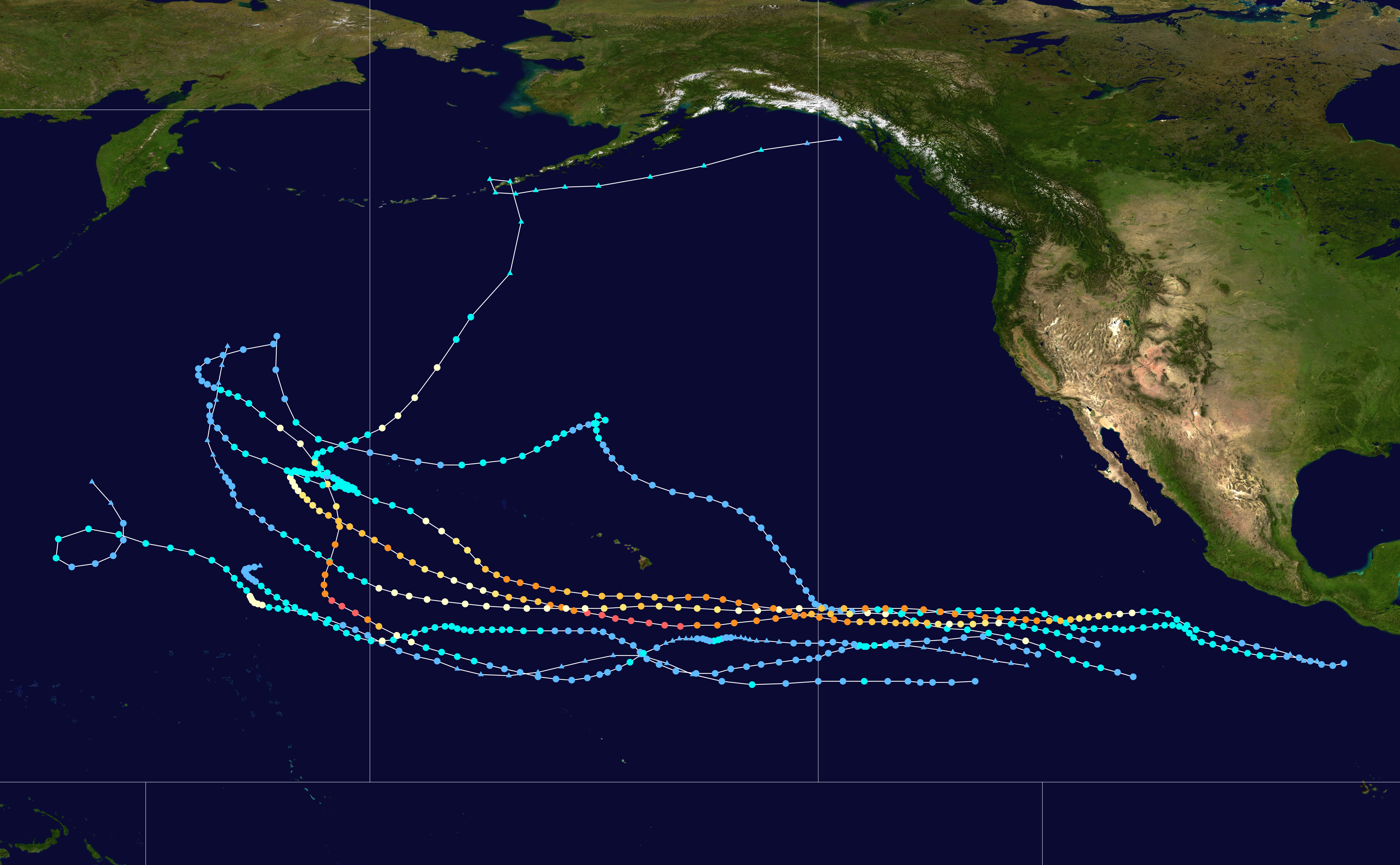
Tracks of tropical cyclones that crossed from the eastern Pacific to the western Pacific

Neither eastern Pacific tropical cyclones passing 140°W, nor central Pacific tropical cyclones crossing the dateline, are notable events. However, very few eastern Pacific proper cyclones that enter the central Pacific make it to the dateline.

Season	Name	Ref.
1986	Georgette†	
1991	Enrique	
1994	Li‡	
1994	John	
1999	Dora	
2014	Genevieve†	
2018	Hector	
2023	Dora	
2026	Nolo†‡	

† System ceased to be a tropical cyclone and regenerated at least once during its life span.

‡ System formed in the eastern Pacific, but was not named until it crossed into the central Pacific.

In addition, Hurricane Jimena of 2003 is recognized per NHC, CPHC and JTWC as a storm that existed in all three areas of responsibility, but isn't recognized by the JMA as an official western Pacific tropical cyclone.

=== From Western Pacific to Central Pacific ===
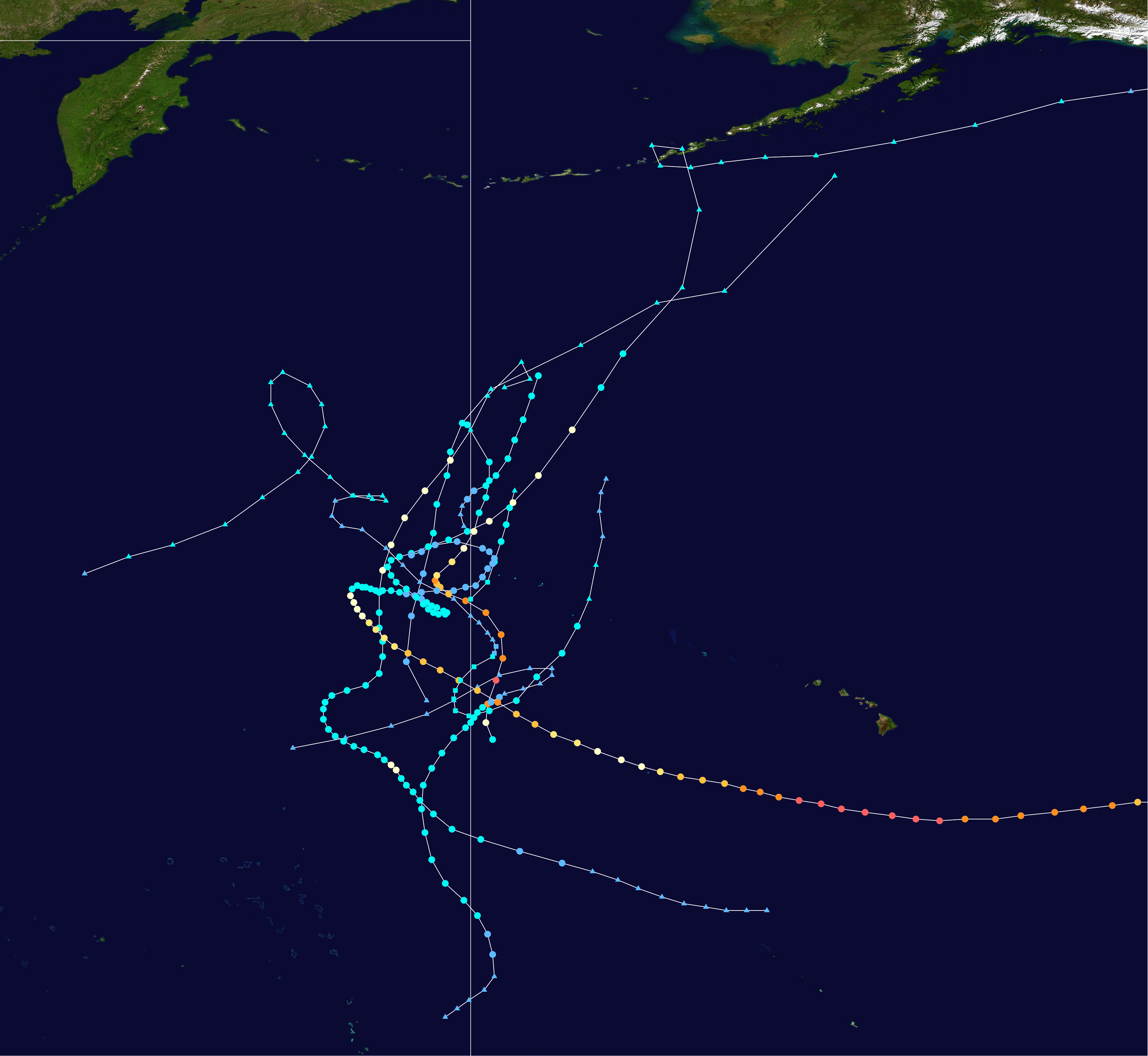
Tracks of tropical cyclones that crossed from the western Pacific to the central Pacific

Tropical cyclones crossing from the western Pacific to the central Pacific are fairly rare, and this has happened only ten times. Of those ten times, six of them were storms which crossed the dateline twice; from the western to the central Pacific and back (or vice versa). No tropical cyclone from the western Pacific has ever traveled east of 140°W.

Season	Name	Ref.
1958	June†	
1959	Patsy†	
1968	Virginia	
1980	Carmen†	
1984	Moke	
1985	Skip†	
1994	John†*	
1996	Seventeen-W†	
2000	Wene	
2010	Omeka	
2026	Olana	

† System crossed the dateline twice.

* Hurricane/Typhoon John formed in the eastern Pacific.

=== From Central Pacific to Eastern Pacific ===
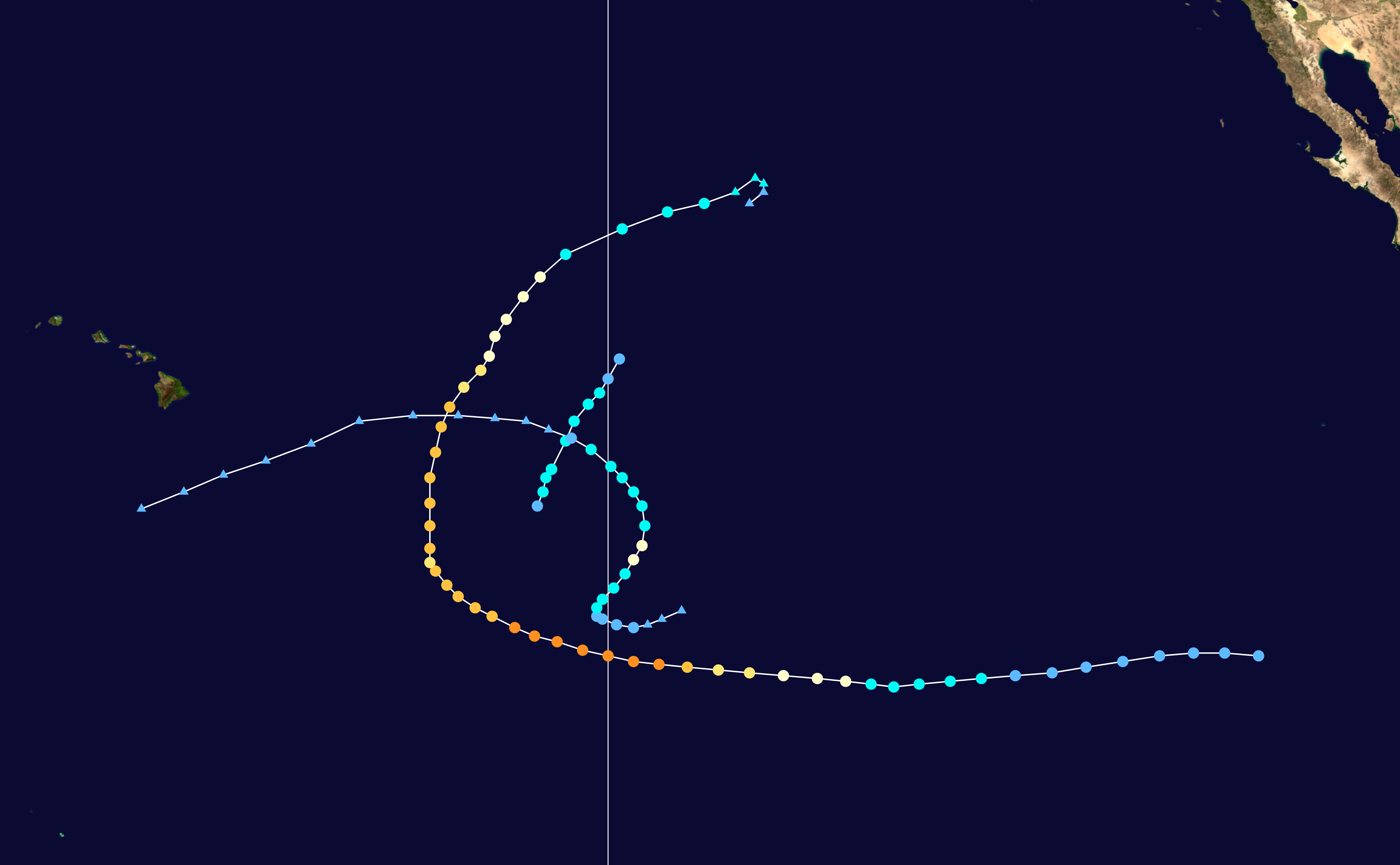
Tracks of tropical cyclones that crossed from the central Pacific to the eastern Pacific

Tropical cyclones crossing from the eastern Pacific to the central Pacific are routine; ones going the other way are not. That event has happened four times.

Season	Name	Ref.
1975	Unnamed	
1982	Ema	
2015	Olaf†	
2016	Ulika†	

† System crossed 140°W more than once.

In addition to these, an unofficial cyclone formed on October 30, 2006 in the central Pacific subtropics. It eventually developed an eye-like structure. Its track data indicates that it crossed from the central to the east Pacific because it formed at longitude 149°W and dissipated at 135°W. NASA, which is not a meteorological organization, called this system a subtropical cyclone, and the Naval Research Laboratory Monterey had enough interest in it to call it 91C. The system has also been called extratropical. This cyclone is unofficial because it is not included in the seasonal reports of either Regional Specialized Meteorological Center.

== Intensity records ==
=== Ten most intense ===
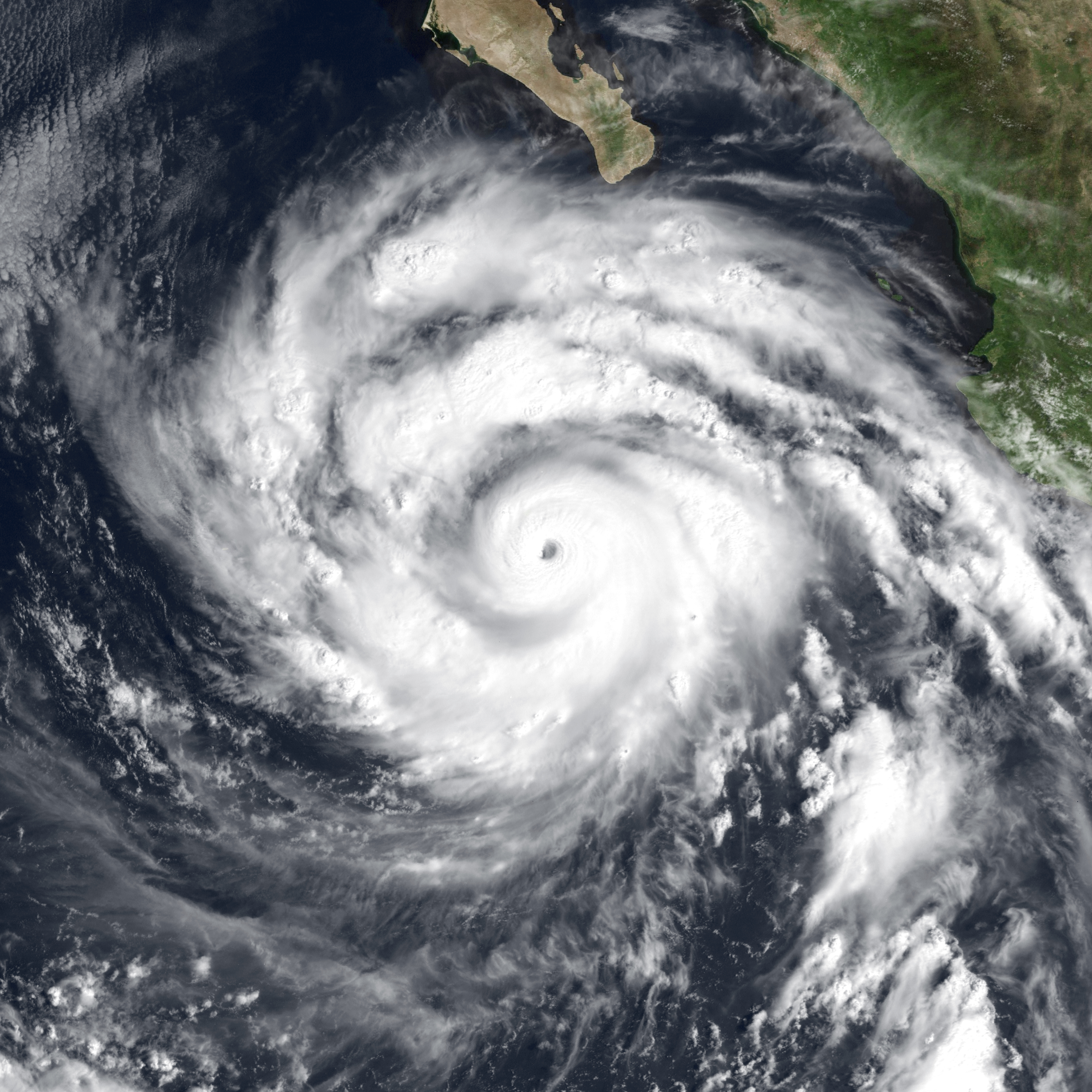
Hurricane Linda, the third most intense Pacific hurricane on record

==== Per lowest central pressure ====
The apparent increase in recent seasons is spurious; it is due to better estimation and measurement, not an increase in intense storms. That is, until 1988, Pacific hurricanes generally did not have their central pressures measured or estimated from satellite imagery.

Rank	Hurricane	Year	Pressure
1	Patricia	2015	872 mbar‡
2	Polo	2026	892 mbar†
3	Linda	1997	902 mbar*
4	Rick	2009	906 mbar*
5	Kenna	2002	913 mbar‡
6	Ava	1973	915 mbar†
6	Ioke	2006	915 mbar*
8	Marie	2014	918 mbar*
8	Odile	2014	918 mbar‡
10	Guillermo	1997	919 mbar*

* Estimated from satellite imagery

‡ Measured and adjusted

† Measured

~ Pressure while East of the International Date Line

==== Per highest sustained winds ====
Rank	Hurricane	Year	Winds
1	Patricia	2015	215 mph; 345 km/h
2	Linda	1997	185 mph; 295 km/h
3	Rick	2009	180 mph; 285 km/h
3	Polo	2026	180 mph; 285 km/h
5	Patsy	1959	175 mph; 280 km/h
5	John	1994	175 mph; 280 km/h
7	Kenna	2002	165 mph; 270 km/h
7	Otis	2023	165 mph; 270 km/h

=== Strongest storm in each month ===
Intensity is measured solely by central pressure unless the pressure is not known, in which case intensity is measured by maximum sustained winds.

Month	Name	Year	Minimum pressure	Maximum winds	Classification
January	Pali	2016	977 mb (hPa)	100 mph (155 km/h)	Category 2
February	Ekeka†	1992	≤ 985 mb (hPa)	115 mph (185 km/h)	Category 3
March	Hali†	1992	1005 mb (hPa)	50 mph (85 km/h)	Tropical storm
April	Carmen†	1980	unknown mb (hPa)	50 mph (85 km/h)	Tropical storm
May	Amanda	2014	932 mb (hPa)	155 mph (250 km/h)	Category 4
June	Ava	1973	915 mb (hPa)	160 mph (260 km/h)	Category 5
July	Gilma	1994	920 mb (hPa)	160 mph (260 km/h)	Category 5
August	Ioke	2006	915 mb (hPa)	160 mph (260 km/h)	Category 5
September	Polo	2026	892 mb (hPa)	180 mph (285 km/h)	Category 5
October	Patricia	2015	872 mb (hPa)	215 mph (345 km/h)	Category 5
November	Sandra	2015	934 mb (hPa)	150 mph (240 km/h)	Category 4
December	Omeka	2010	997 mb (hPa)	50 mph (85 km/h)	Tropical storm

† This tropical cyclone is the strongest to form in its month by virtue of it being the only known system.

=== Strongest landfalling storms ===
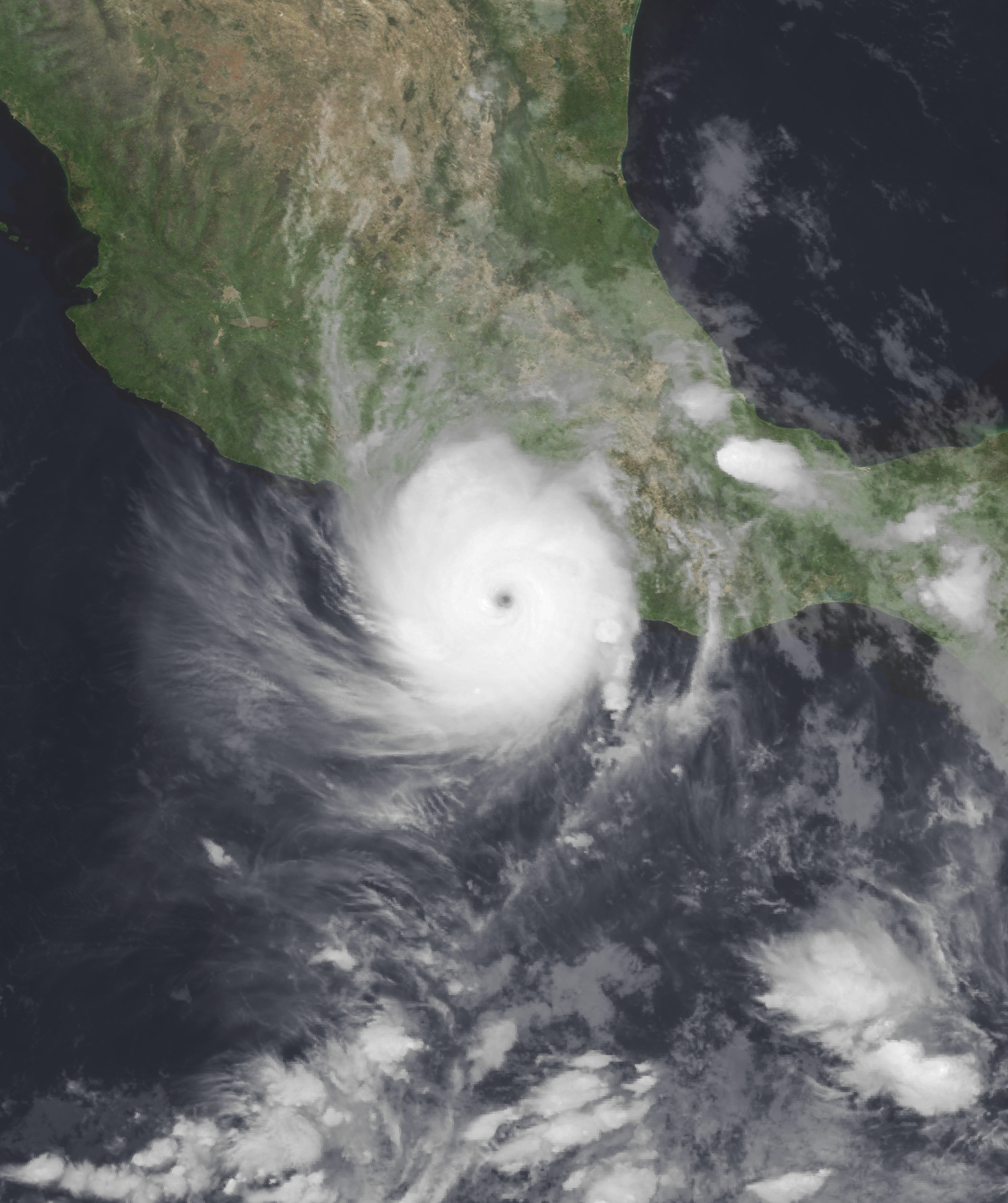
Hurricane Otis of 2023 is the strongest landfalling Pacific hurricane on record

Pacific hurricanes with a wind speed of 130 mph (215 km/h) or higher at landfall
Hurricane	Season	Wind speed	Ref.
Otis	2023	160 mph (260 km/h)	
Patricia	2015	150 mph (240 km/h)	
Madeline	1976	145 mph (230 km/h)	
Twelve	1957	140 mph (220 km/h)	
"Mexico"	1959	140 mph (220 km/h)	
Iniki	1992	140 mph (220 km/h)	
Kenna	2002	140 mph (220 km/h)	
Lidia	2023	140 mph (220 km/h)	

== Unusual landfall locations ==
=== California ===
- After October or before June, 1854 – A system considered a tropical cyclone makes landfall just north of the Golden Gate.
- October 2, 1858 – A hurricane makes a direct hit on Southern California before dissipating. The hurricane may or may not have made landfall in San Diego County, due to uncertainty in the track reconstruction. San Diego experienced hurricane-force winds, with torrential rainfall recorded all across Southern California.
- After October or before June, 1859 – A system considered a tropical cyclone makes landfall between Cape Mendocino and San Francisco Bay.
- September 25, 1939 – The 1939 California tropical storm makes landfall in San Pedro, California, killing 45 to 93 people.
- September 6, 1972 – Tropical Depression Hyacinth makes landfall.
- September 6, 1978 – Tropical Depression Norman makes landfall.

=== Hawaii ===
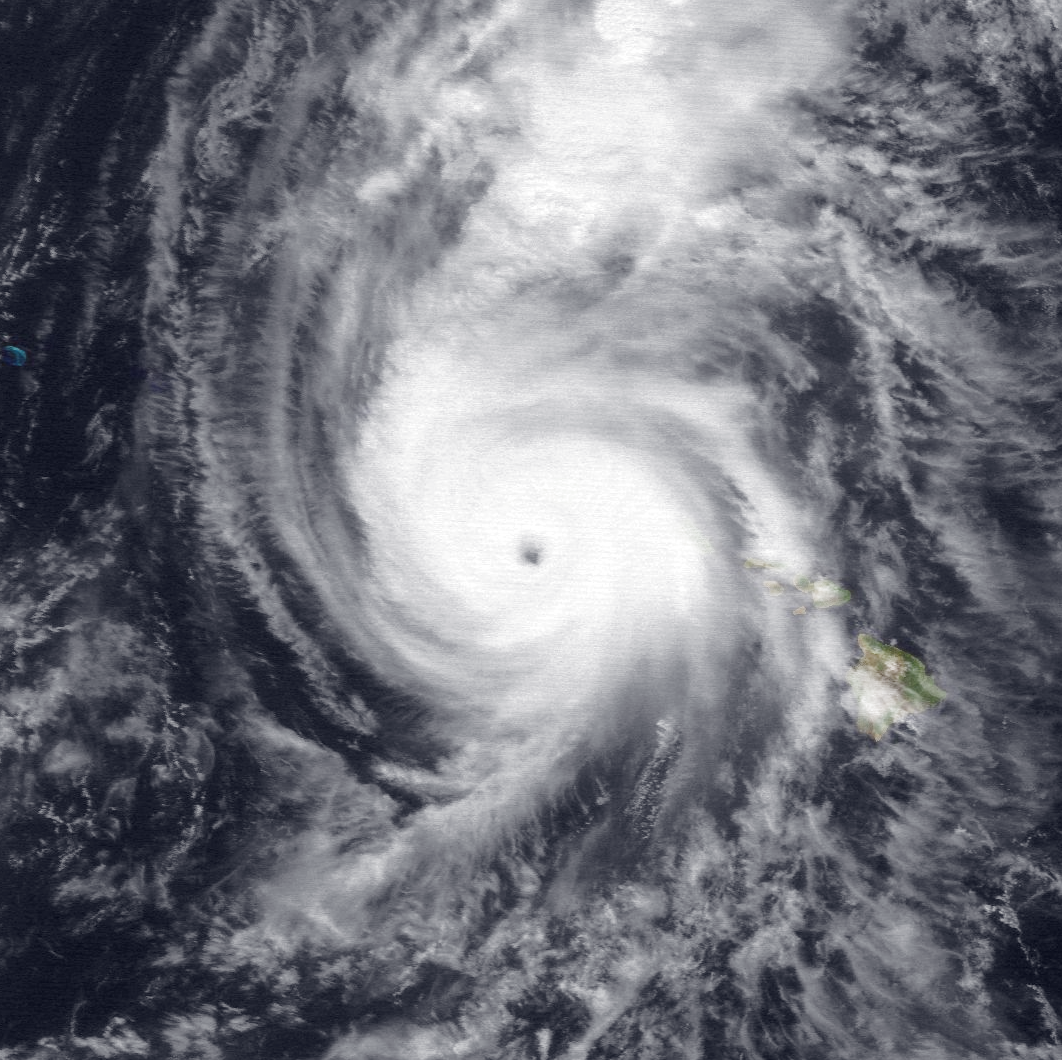
Hurricane Iniki over Hawaii

- August 9, 1871 - Indigenous sources suggest that a Category 3 hurricane struck the Big Island and Maui.
- August 7, 1958 – A tropical storm makes landfall on the Big Island of Hawaii.
- August 7, 1959 – Hurricane Dot makes landfall on Kauai.
- October 20, 1983 – Tropical Depression Raymond makes landfall on Molokai, Oahu, and Kauai.
- August 3, 1988 – Tropical Depression Gilma makes landfall on Maui and Molokai.
- September 11, 1992 – Hurricane Iniki makes landfall on Kauai, killing six throughout the islands.
- September 14, 1992 – Tropical Depression Orlene makes landfall on the Big Island.
- July 24, 1993 – Tropical Depression Eugene makes landfall on the Big Island of Hawaii.
- August 8, 2014 – Tropical Storm Iselle makes landfall on the Big Island of Hawaii, killing one on Kauai.
- July 24, 2016 – Tropical Storm Darby makes landfall on the Big Island of Hawaii.
- September 12, 2018 – Tropical Storm Olivia makes landfall on Maui and Lanai.

== Wettest tropical cyclones ==
All of these values are point maxima.

=== Mexico ===
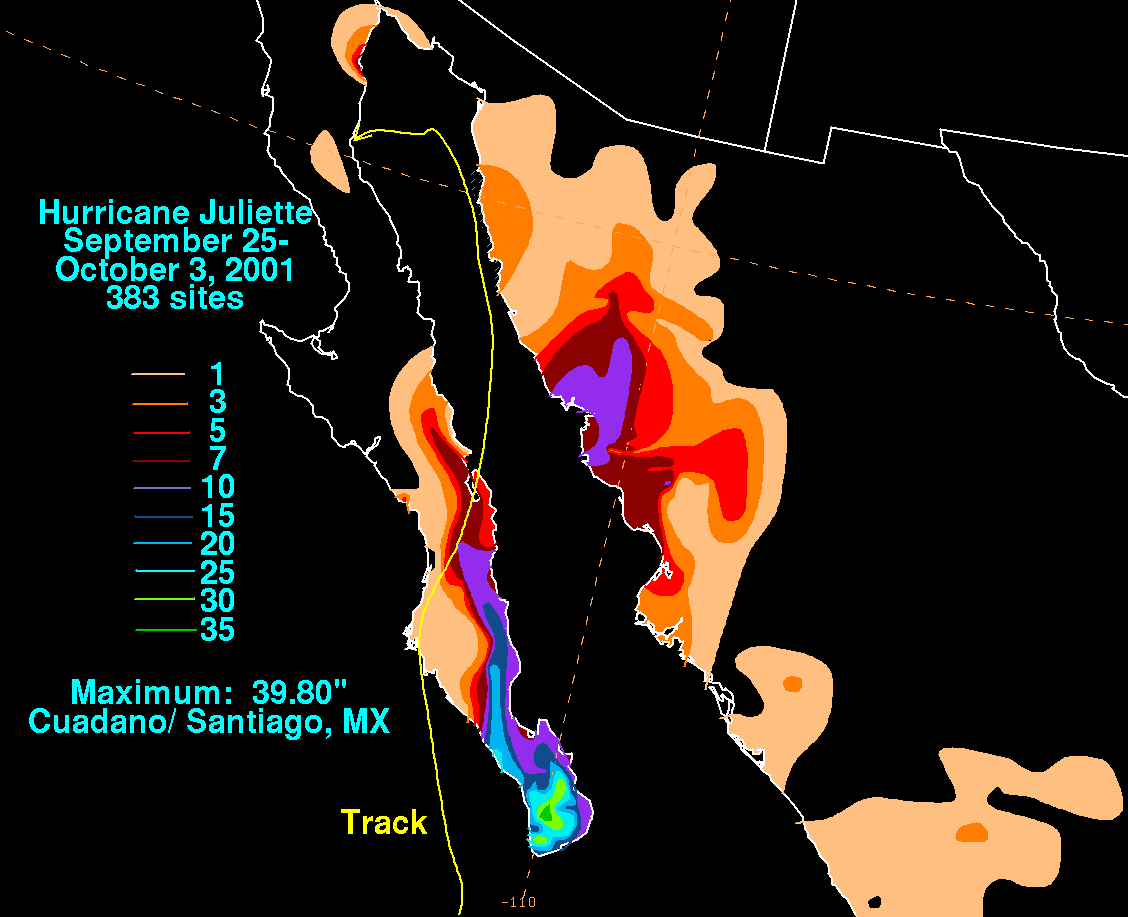
Rainfall data from 2001's Hurricane Juliette

Wettest Pacific tropical cyclones and their remnants in Mexico Highest-known totals
Precipitation			Storm	Location	Ref.
Rank	mm	in	Storm	Location	Ref.
1	1442	56.8	John 2024	Guerrero	
2	1011	39.80	Juliette 2001	Cuadano/Santiago	
3	686.0	27.01	Pauline 1997	San Luis Acatlan	
4	628.1	24.73	Odile 1984	Costa Azul/Acapulco	
5	610.1	24.02	Isis 1998	Caduano/Santiago	
6	570.0	22.44	Flossie 2001	Suchixtlahuaca	
7	566.9	22.32	Greg 1999	Tecoman	
8	531.9	20.94	Nora 1997	La Cruz/Elota	
9	525.3	20.68	Eugene 1987	Aquila	
10	523.0	20.59	Lidia 1981	El Varonjal/Badiraguato	

=== Hawaii ===
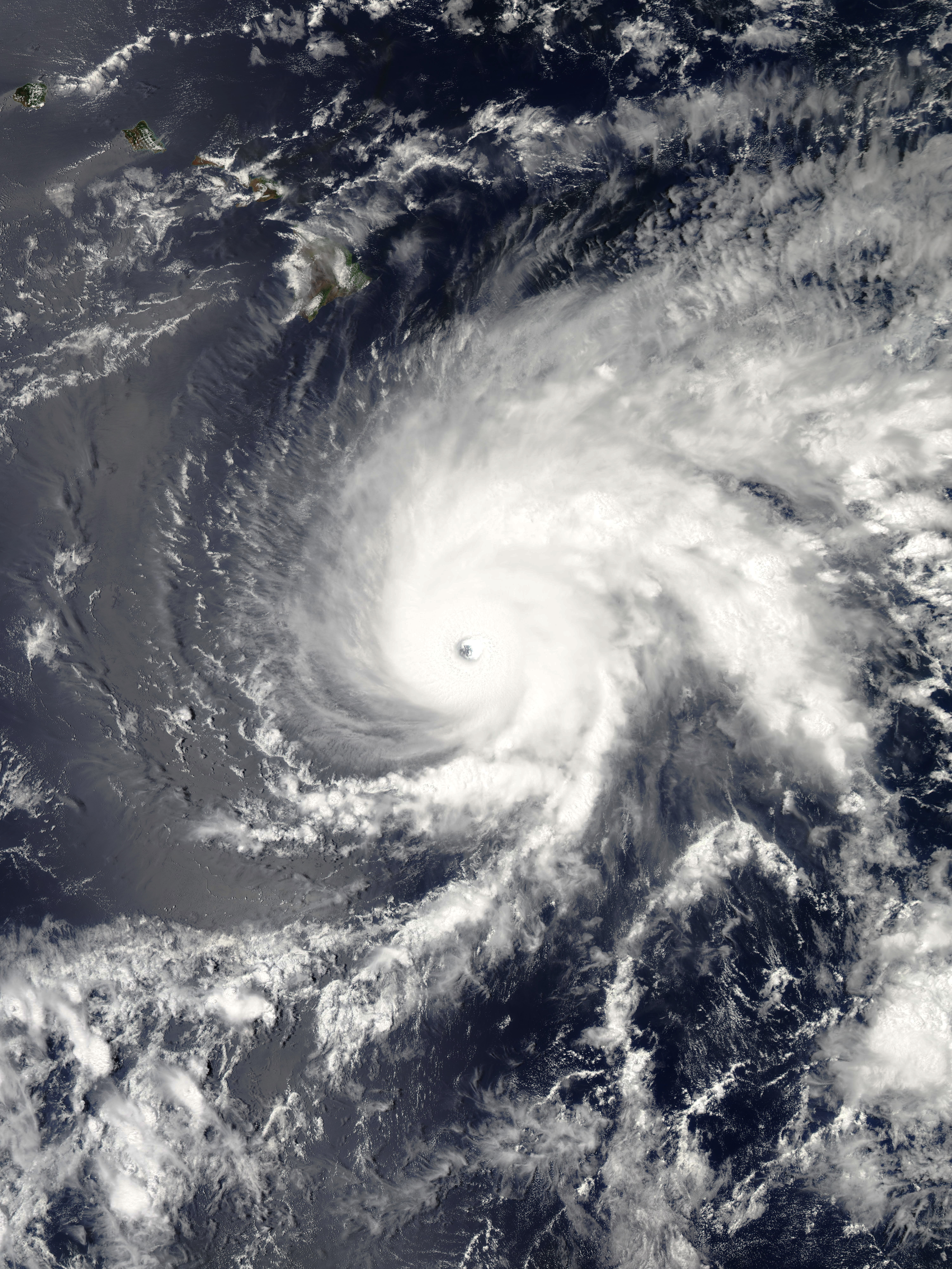
Hurricane Lane

Wettest tropical cyclones and their remnants in Hawaii Highest-known totals
Precipitation			Storm	Location	Ref.
Rank	mm	in	Storm	Location	Ref.
1	1473	58.00	Lane 2018	Kahūnā Falls, Hawaii	
2	1321	52.00	Hiki 1950	Kanalohuluhulu Ranger Station	
3	1106	43.54	Lala 2026	Laupāhoehoe	
4	985	38.76	Paul 2000	Kapapala Ranch 36	
5	935	36.83	Nolo 2026	Mount Waiʻaleʻale	
6	635	25.00	Maggie 1970	Various stations	
7	536	21.11	Lowell 2026	Kilohana	
8	519	20.42	Nina 1957	Wainiha	
9	516	20.33	Iwa 1982	Intake Wainiha 1086	
10	476	18.75	Fabio 1988	Papaikou Mauka 140.1	

=== Continental United States ===
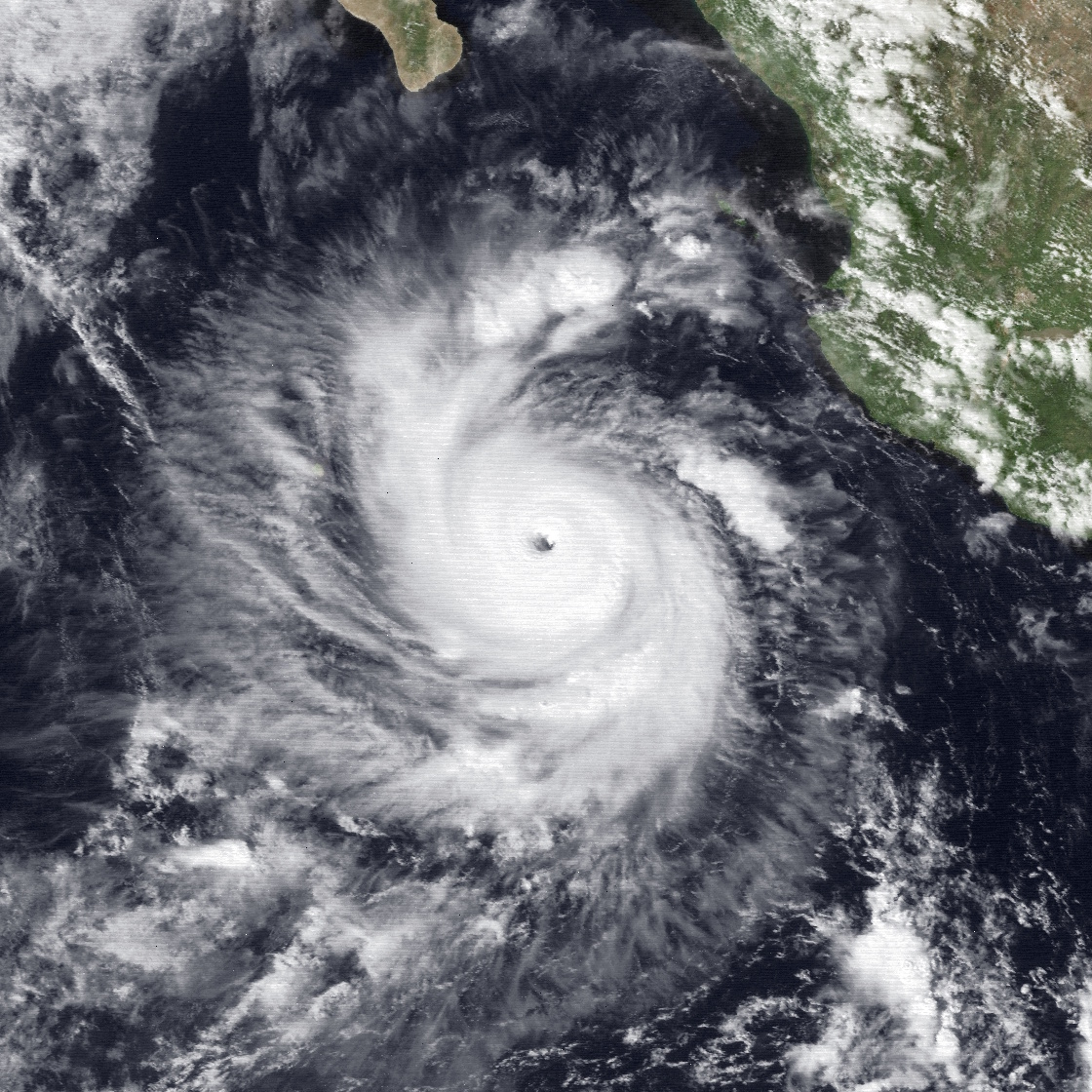
Hurricane Norma

Wettest Pacific tropical cyclones and their remnants on the continental United States Highest-known totals
Precipitation			Storm	Location	Ref.
Rank	mm	in	Storm	Location	Ref.
1	533.7 mm	21.01 in	Norma 1981	Breckenridge, Texas	
2	430.5 mm	16.95 in	Tico 1983	Chickasha, Oklahoma	
3	387.7 mm	15.26 in	Odile 2014	Gail, Texas	
4	374.9 mm	14.76 in	Kathleen 1976	Mount San Gorgonio, California	
5	350.5 mm	13.80 in	Roslyn 1986	Matagorda Texas #2	
6	332.0 mm	13.07 in	Hilary 2023	Upper Mission Creek, California	
7	305.1 mm	12.01 in	Nora 1997	Harquahala Mountains, Arizona	
8	304.8 mm	12.00 in	Octave 1983	Mount Graham, Arizona	
9	302.8 mm	11.92 in	Norma 1970	Workman Creek, Arizona	
10	294.6 mm	11.60 in	Unnamed 1939	Mount Wilson (California)	

=== Overall ===
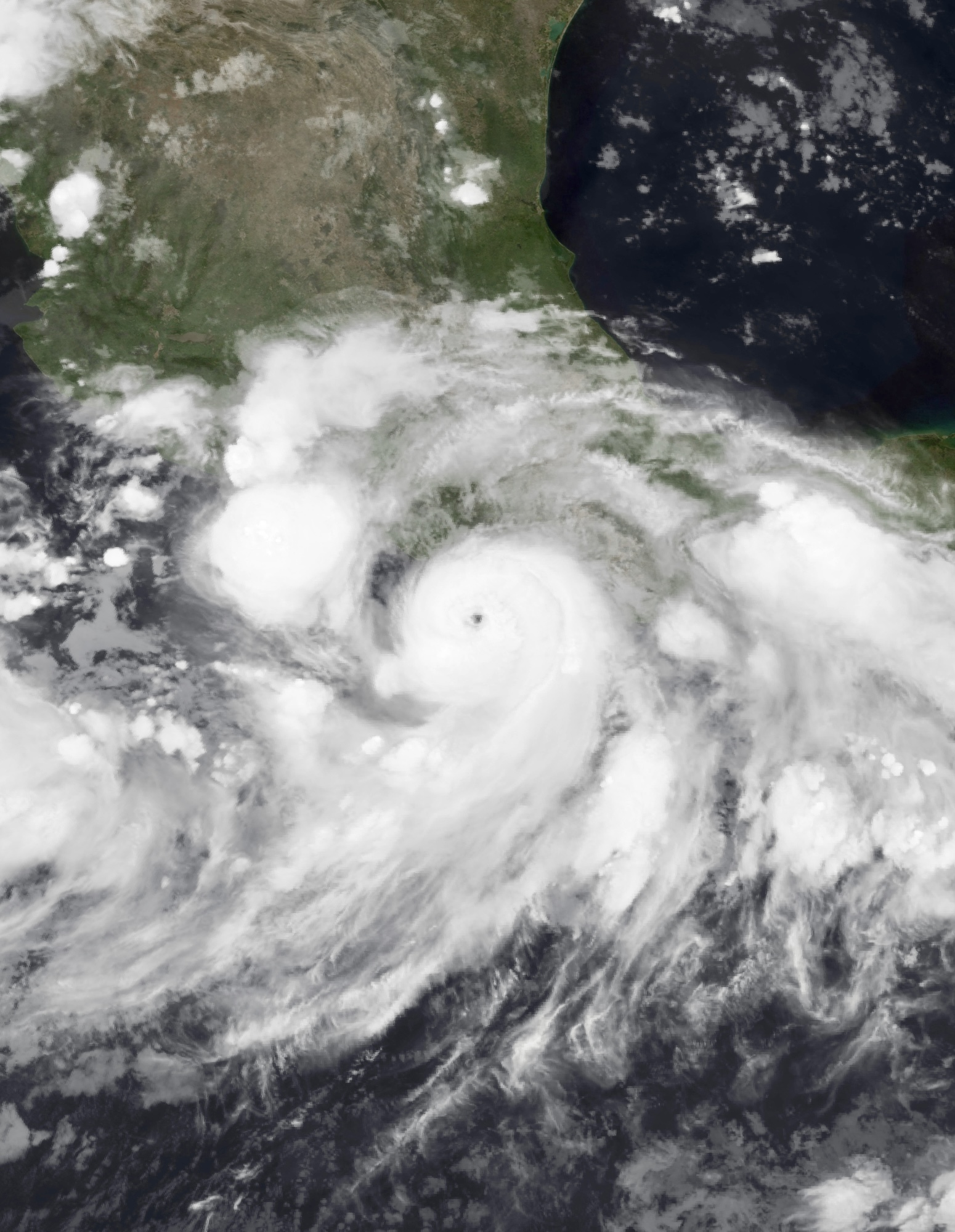
Hurricane John

Wettest tropical cyclones and their remnants within the Eastern Pacific tropical cyclone basin Highest-known totals
Precipitation			Storm	Location	Ref.
Rank	mm	in	Storm	Location	Ref.
1	1442	56.8	John 2024	Guerrero	
2	1321	52.02	Lane 2018	Mountainview, Hawaii	
3	1321	52.00	Hiki 1950	Kanalohuluhulu Ranger Station, Hawaii	
4	1106	43.54	Lala 2026	Laupāhoehoe	
5	1011	39.80	Juliette 2001	Cuadano/Santiago, Mexico	
6	984.5	38.76	Paul 2000	Kapapala Ranch, Hawaii	
7	732.0	28.82	Hone 2024	Hakalau, Hawaii	
8	686.0	27.01	Pauline 1997	San Luis Acatlan, Mexico	
9	635.0	25.00	Maggie 1970	Hawaii	
10	628.1	24.73	Odile 1984	Costa Azul/Acapulco, Mexico	

== Worldwide cyclone records set by Pacific storms ==
- Highest official wind speed ever recorded in a tropical cyclone: Hurricane Patricia with maximum sustained winds of 215 mph (345 km/h).
- Fastest intensification (1-minute sustained surface winds): Hurricane Patricia 55 m/s (120 mph, 105 kt, 195 km/h), from 40 m/s (85 mph, 75 kt, 140 km/h) to 95 m/s (205 mph, 180 kt, 335 km/h) in under 24 h
- Farthest-travelling tropical cyclone: Hurricane John travelled for 13,180 km.
- Highest Accumulated cyclone energy (ACE) index for a tropical cyclone: Hurricane Ioke achieved an ACE index of 85.
- Tropical cyclone at Category 4 or 5 intensity on the Saffir–Simpson scale for the longest: Hurricane Ioke was at that intensity for 198 consecutive hours.

== See also ==
- List of tropical cyclone records
- List of Atlantic hurricane records
- Outline of tropical cyclones
