= Hurricane John (2024) =

Category 3 Pacific hurricane in 2024

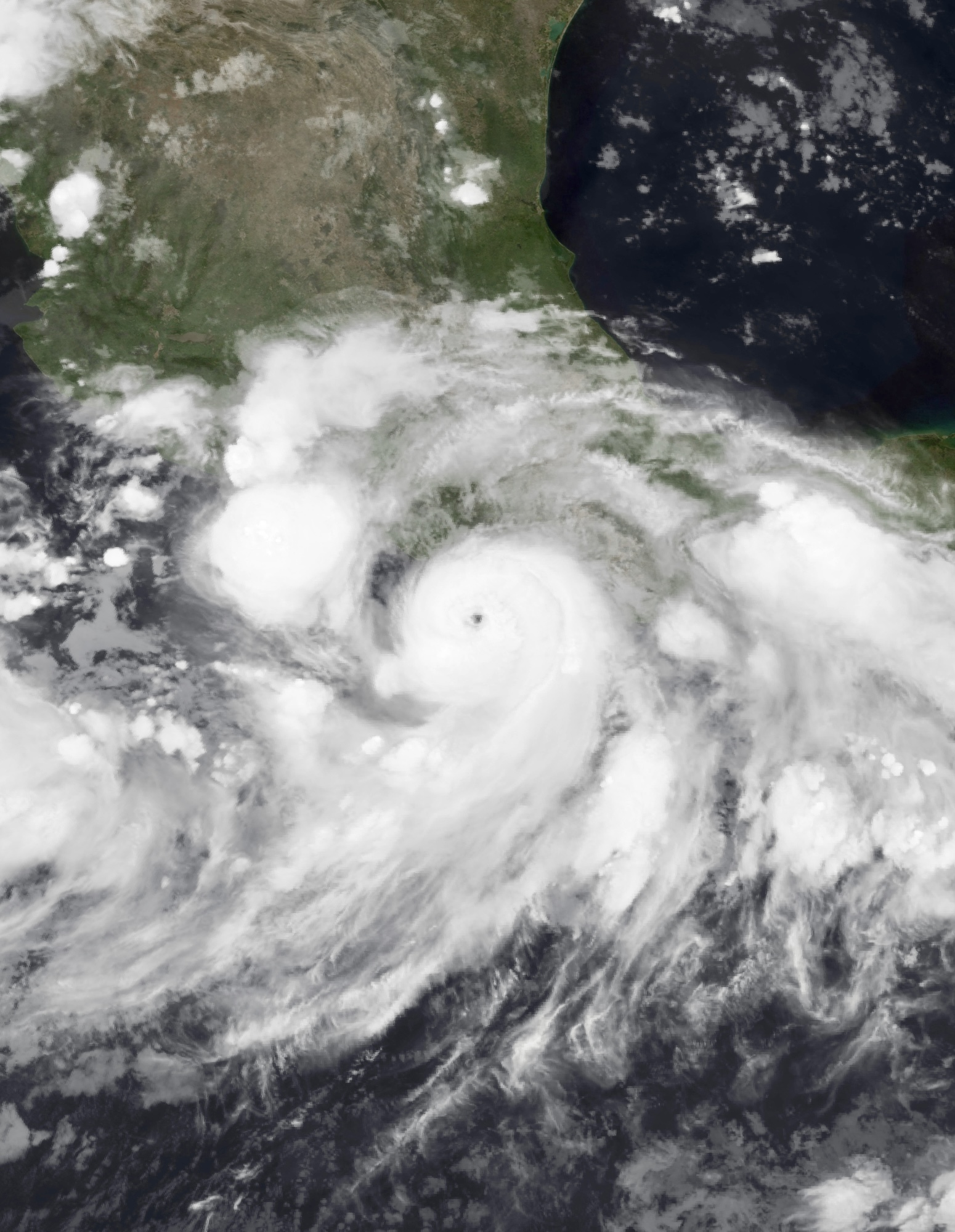
- Hurricane John approaching Guerrero on September 24

Meteorological history
- Formed: September 22, 2024
- Dissipated: September 27, 2024

Category 3 major hurricane
- 1-minute sustained (SSHWS/NWS)
- Highest winds: 120 mph (195 km/h)
- Lowest pressure: 956 mbar (hPa); 28.23 inHg

Overall effects
- Fatalities: 29 total
- Damage: $2.45 billion (2024 USD)
- Areas affected: Southern Mexico
- IBTrACS
- Part of the 2024 Pacific hurricane season

Hurricane John was a powerful, erratic, and devastating tropical cyclone that caused deadly flooding and record rainfall across southern Mexico for several days in September 2024. The eleventh named storm, fourth hurricane, and second major hurricane of the 2024 Pacific hurricane season, John originated from a low-pressure area offshore Southern Mexico. This low developed into Tropical Depression Ten‑E on the afternoon of September 22, strengthening into Tropical Storm John the following morning. Undergoing rapid intensification, John strengthened from a moderate tropical storm into a Category 3 hurricane on September 24. It was at that intensity that John made landfall in Marquelia, Guerrero, later that day. Once inland, John rapidly weakened, dissipating over Mexico later that day. However, the mid-level remnants of John moved back over the ocean, where favorable conditions enabled John to redevelop. On September 27, after again becoming a minimal hurricane, Tropical Storm John made its second landfall, this time near Tizupan, Michoacán. Hours later, it dissipated for a final time over the coastal mountains.

John resulted in strong winds, catastrophic flooding, and numerous mudslides across much of coastal southwestern Mexico. A total of 950 mm (37 in) of rain fell across parts of Guerrero, with similarly extreme rainfall in neighboring Oaxaca and Michoacán. More than 98,000 people lost power in Oaxaca. As of September 28, twenty-nine deaths have been reported in association with John, and the storm is estimated to have caused US$2.45 billion in damage to southern Mexico, making John the third costliest hurricane to strike the Pacific coast of Mexico in nominal terms.

== Meteorological history ==
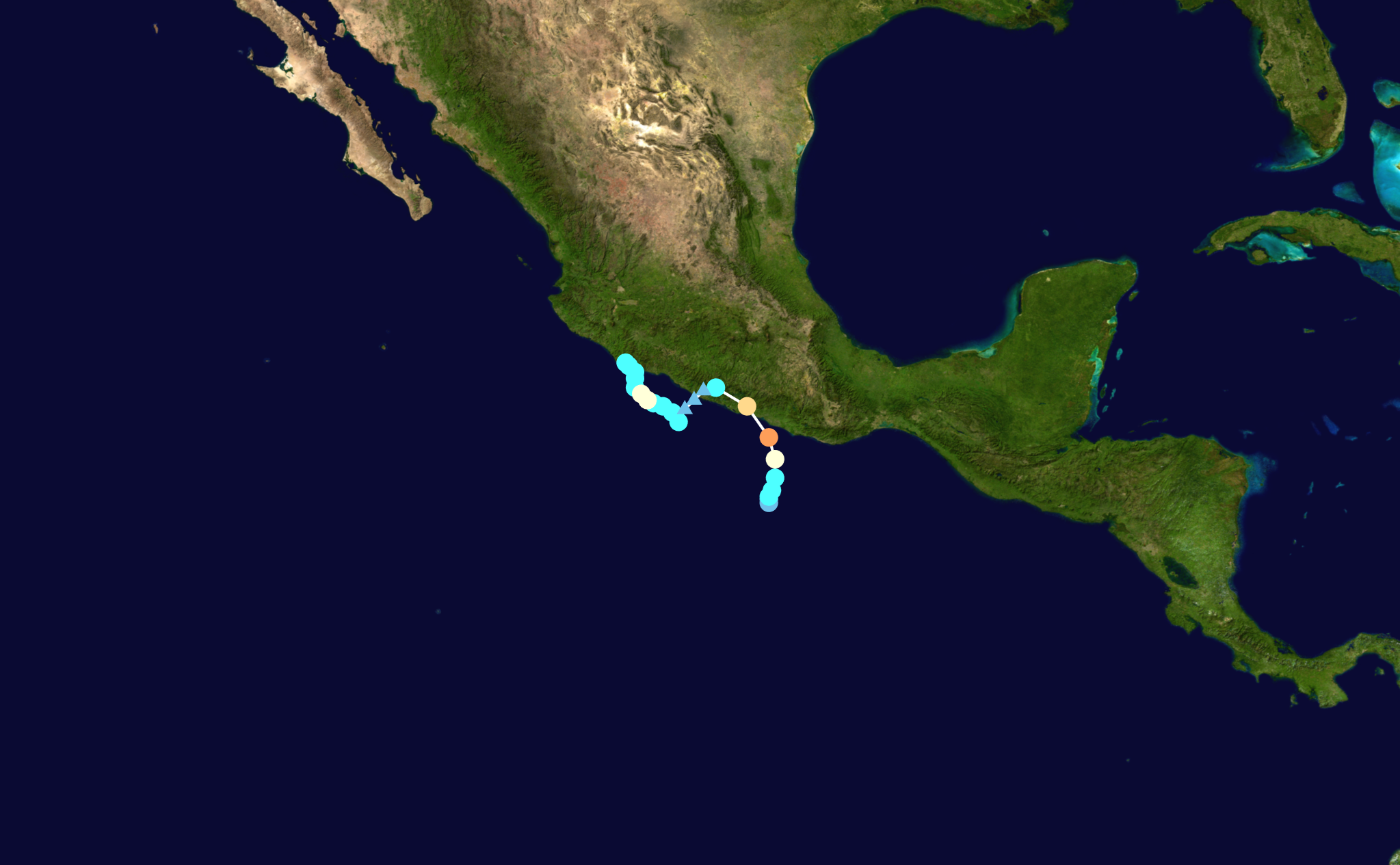
Map plotting the storm's track and intensity, according to the Saffir–Simpson scale Map key Saffir–Simpson scale Tropical depression (≤38 mph, ≤62 km/h) Tropical storm (39–73 mph, 63–118 km/h) Category 1 (74–95 mph, 119–153 km/h) Category 2 (96–110 mph, 154–177 km/h) Category 3 (111–129 mph, 178–208 km/h) Category 4 (130–156 mph, 209–251 km/h) Category 5 (≥157 mph, ≥252 km/h) Unknown Storm type Tropical cyclone Subtropical cyclone Extratropical cyclone, remnant low, tropical disturbance, or monsoon depression

On September 21, an area of low pressure producing disorganized showers and thunderstorms formed off the coast of southern Mexico. The system became better organized the following day and attained a closed surface circulation, resulting in the formation of Tropical Depression Ten‑E on the afternoon of September 22, about 175 mi (280 km) south of Punta Maldonado, Guerrero. The system continued to develop that night, and strengthened into Tropical Storm John at 06:00 UTC the following morning. While moving slowly to the north-northeast on September 23, caught in the southwesterly flow associated with the monsoon trough near Central America, John initiated rapid intensification. It became a Category 1 hurricane at 17:45 UTC that same day, and then, just nine hours later, reached Category 3 major hurricane intensity with sustained winds of 120 mph (195 km/h). It was at that intensity that John made landfall in Marquelia, Guerrero, about 25 mi (40 km) northwest of Punta Maldonado, at 03:20 UTC on September 24. John rapidly weakened inland, with its winds falling to tropical storm strength about 12 hours later. By 18:00 UTC that day, John dissipated over the rugged terrain of southern Mexico.

An elongated trough developed in association with John's remnants as the cyclone dissipated. The trough produced a large area of shower and thunderstorm activity, and began showing signs of organization on September 25. Ship observations indicated significant pressure falls within the system, and by 15:00 UTC, John reformed into a tropical storm. John moved slowly to the north-northwest after it reformed, and within favorable environmental conditions for strengthening, the storm steadily re-intensified. Continuing its slow motion very close to the southwestern coast of Mexico, John developed a small, closed eye, and re-intensified to a minimal hurricane at 12:00 UTC on September 26. John continued to move very slowly near the coast, where its proximity to the rugged terrain of Mexico halted intensification; the cyclone weakened to a tropical storm at 3:00 UTC the following day. After hugging the coast for nearly 36 hours and continuing to weaken, John finally made landfall on southwestern Mexico for the second time at 16:00 UTC on September 27 with sustained winds of 60 mph (95 km/h). John's surface center dissipated shortly thereafter, and the United States-based National Hurricane Center issued its final advisory on the storm three hours later.

== Preparations ==
Upon the formation of John as a tropical cyclone on the afternoon of September 22, a Tropical Storm Watch was issued from Punta Maldonado to Salina Cruz, Oaxaca. At 09:00 UTC the following day, this was changed to a Tropical Storm Warning from Punta Maldonado to Huatulco, with a Tropical Storm Watch extending to Salina Cruz. A Hurricane Watch was declared within the Tropical Storm Warning area. The Hurricane Watch was upgraded to a Hurricane Warning a few hours later. A red emergency alert was issued for Guerrero and Oaxaca. Paqueteria Tres Guerras and other companies suspended operations in Acapulco. John threatened parts of Mexico still recovering from Hurricane Otis the previous year, which underwent a similar rapid intensification phase. Tourists in Puerto Escondido, Oaxaca, were expected to be evacuated by the Secretariat of Civil Protection (SSPC). Businesses across the city were closed. The Puerto Escondido International Airport also closed for the duration of the storm. 4,476 schools were closed. When the storm redeveloped, a red emergency alert was issued for Michoacán and classes were suspended. The port of Lázaro Cárdenas was closed. In Colima, an orange emergency alert was issued and 15 shelters were opened. Officials warned of wind speeds up to 70–90 km/h (43-56 mph), wave heights of 2–4 meters (6.56-13.1 ft), and waterspouts. In the State of Mexico, a yellow emergency alert was issued. Residents were urged to remove trash from gutters and avoid crossing flooded roadways. In Veracruz, a blue alert was issued. Officials in Jalisco warned of rainfall totals up to 150–250 mm (5.91-9.84 in).

Authorities in Oaxaca opened 110 temporary storm shelters, while 299 were opened in Guerrero. The Federal Electricity Commission (CFE) deployed over 1,400 electricians and several cranes and emergency power plants to respond to power outages in affected regions. Schools were closed across Guerrero and Oaxaca.

== Impact ==
Wettest tropical cyclones and their remnants Mexico (Overall) Highest-known totals
| Precipitation | | | Storm | Location | Ref. |
| Rank | mm | in | Storm | Location | Ref. |
|---|---|---|---|---|---|
| 1 | 1576 | 62.05 | Wilma 2005 | Quintana Roo | |
| 2 | 1442 | 56.8 | John 2024 | Acapulco | |
| 3 | 1119 | 44.06 | Frances 1998 | Escuintla | |
| 4 | 1107 | 43.6 | Manuel 2013 | Acapulco | |
| 5 | 1098 | 43.23 | TD 11 (1999) | Jalacingo | |
| 6 | 1011 | 39.80 | Juliette 2001 | Cuadano/Santiago | |
| 7 | 950 | 37.41 | Dolly 1996 | Igualapa | |
| 8 | 941 | 37.06 | Fifi–Orlene 1974 | Tlanchinol | |
| 9 | 890 | 35.04 | Alex 2010 | Monterrey | |
| 10 | 829 | 32.62 | Pauline 1997 | Puente Jula | |

According to Gallagher Re, economic losses totaled to US$2.45 billion. At least 29 people died in the storm: 23 in Guerrero, 5 in Oaxaca, and 1 in Michoacán. John dropped historic amounts of rain over Mexico, bringing 214% more water than Hurricane Pauline, which devastated southern Mexico in 1997. A maximum of 1,442 mm (56.8 in) of rain fell in Acapulco, Guerrero, five times the amount that Hurricane Otis brought the previous year. In Lázaro Cárdenas, Michoacán, 782 mm (30.8 in) of rain fell, a number not seen since Hurricane Manuel in 2013. Over 250 mm (10 in) of rain fell across parts of Guerrero and Oaxaca within the first few hours after John's landfall. Some local regions along John's path received 80% of their typical yearly rainfall from the storm. Torrential rains also fell across the neighboring states of Chiapas, Veracruz, Michoacán and Puebla. Areas along the southwestern Mexican coast experienced mudslides while tin roofs were blown off several houses. Overall, at least 395,000 households lost power during the storm.

=== Guerrero ===
In Guerrero, numerous landslides damaged or destroyed roads, isolating many rural communities. Severe damage was reported in 40 municipalities. At least 143 roads suffered severe damage and 40 bridges collapsed. Numerous vehicles were crushed by rockslides. Severe agricultural impact was also reported, with 7,268 corn, plantain, and coconut farmers suffering losses. Around 260,000 hectares of corn were lost, affecting 60% of the harvest. Additionally, 10,000 hectares of mango were lost, affecting 60% of the harvest. Overall, a total of 41,101 homes in Guerrero were in need of significant reconstruction or rehabilitation due to the extensive damage wrought by John.

In Acapulco, the Mexican federal government's National Civil Protection Coordination rescued 5,120 people from flooded areas. Extensive flooding occurred across 39 neighborhoods and 18 urban areas in Acapulco. Floodwaters rose to levels not seen since Hurricanes Manuel and Ingrid in 2013. Twenty people in an apartment complex were forced to move to the rooftop of their buildings due to rising floodwaters. 40,000 homes were isolated due to flooding. More than 39,491 homes were flooded, leaving 127,844 people homeless. In the Diamante Zone, floodwaters reached an average of 1.5–2 meters (4.92-6.56 ft) in homes. At least 206 hotels, 569 schools, 105 restaurants, and numerous animal shelters were damaged as well. Numerous transportation lines in the city were disrupted. The Arena GNP Seguros was flooded. A drainpipe was damaged, causing wastewater to flood onto several streets. Storm surge caused garbage to pile up onto beaches. Four boats sunk due to high waves. A total of 120,000 people were left jobless as a result of the storm. Initially, it was estimated that rebuilding the port of Acapulco would cost more than Mex$50 billion (US$2.67 billion). However, it was later determined that total losses in the city reached Mex$22 billion (US$1.18 billion), with commercial losses estimated at Mex$5 billion (US$268 million). President of Mexico Andrés Manuel López Obrador reported that fifteen people were killed in Acapulco. A wall collapsed, killing a four-year-old girl and injuring a six-year-old boy. A house was swept away by floodwaters, killing a six-year-old boy and injuring his mother. A man was killed after being swept away by an overflowing river. An 88-year-old woman, a 45-year-old couple, and another elderly woman were killed after landslides caused their homes to collapse on them. A 52-year-old man was killed after falling down while cleaning his flooded home. Additionally, two others were reported missing after a wall collapse.

Outside of Acapulco, damage was reported in 28 municipalities, with a total of 27,000 homes being damaged, affecting 108,792 people. In Copala, near where the storm made its first landfall, heavy rain and wind gusts up to 220 km/h (137 mph) destroyed more than 100 restaurants, hotels, homes, and beach huts. In Costa Azul, a ten-meter sinkhole was reported. In Las Vigas, a sustained wind of 72 km/h (45 mph) and a wind gust of 127 km/h (79 mph) were recorded. In Chilpancingo, the Huacapa river overflowed, flooding the El Palmar and Renacimiento neighborhoods. There, 700 homes were damaged, with 250 out of them having their roofs blown off completely. A total of 150 homes collapsed and 337 downed trees were reported. At least 60 people fled to a shelter. In the Cerrito Rico neighborhood, floodgates were opened, causing rivers to overflow, sweeping away two vehicles. Several communities were left without running water. A 68-year-old woman was injured after a tree fell on her house. In the Costa Chica region, the Atoyac River overflowed, flooding 300 homes. In Zihuatanejo, patients were evacuated after heavy rains caused the ceiling of a hospital to collapse. Two fishing boats sank due to high waves. In La Unión, gusty winds blew off the roofs of buildings and storm surge flooded several areas. In Tecpan de Galeana, a market and sports complex were flooded. Governor of Guerrero Evelyn Salgado reported two deaths caused by a landslide in the municipality of Tlacoachistlahuaca. Additionally, a 70-year-old woman was killed in Malinaltepec when a landslide struck her house and a man drowned after being swept away by an overflowing ravine. In the community of El Ciruelar, a man was killed while trying to leave his community in search for help. In Tecoanapa, a 28-year-old man was killed after the wall of his home collapsed on him. In the Tierra Caliente region, three men were killed after their truck was swept away by an overflowing river.

=== Oaxaca ===
In Oaxaca, wind gusts up to 200 km/h (124 mph) and wave heights of 5–7 m (16.4–23 ft) were reported. Damage was reported in 73 municipalities. Fallen trees and a total of 131 landslides were reported, 80 of which occurred in the Mixteca Region, isolating at least 30 communities, damaging 300 roads, and destroying numerous bridges. A sinkhole was reported on the Oaxaca-Pinotepa highway. Power outages were also reported. At least 1,240 homes were flooded, with 15 of them collapsing completely, affecting 5,500 families. A total of 122 schools were damaged as well. Overall, officials estimated a total of 7,845 homes needed to be reconstructed due to the severe damage from the storm. At least 21,000 hectares of corn and papaya, along with large amounts of lemon, chili, squash, hibiscus, and plantain, were lost. More than 200 cattle, along with numerous chickens, were killed, affecting 32 livestock members and 600 farmers. Due to the extensive flooding, crocodiles were sighted. A disaster declaration was requested in 65 municipalities. Damage statewide totaled to Mex$1.06 billion (US$57.7 million). In San José Peñasco, a man was killed after being swept away by a river. In Amoltepec, a woman was killed after her house was buried in a landslide. A five-year-old boy was found dead after the passage of the storm. A man and his grandson were killed after being buried by a landslide.

=== Michoacán ===
In Michoacán, flooding, fallen trees, and landslides were reported. The Cutzamala River and Balsas River overflowed, flooding a total of 799 homes and 150 schools, affecting 1,300 people. More than 21,000 hectares of corn, sorghum, and sesame were flooded, affecting 9,541 agricultural products. A total of 970 cows and pigs were lost, and 3,852 kilometers of farm roads were damaged as well. 68 landslides were reported, damaging 16 roads and bridges. A portion of the road to Tumbiscatío was completely destroyed. The government estimated that it would cost Mex$80–90 million (US$4.25-4.78 million) to repair the road. The government estimated that a total of Mex$520 million (US$27.7 million) would be needed to repair the damage to roads caused by the storm. In Lázaro Cárdenas, a storage yard with cars was flooded. A bridge to San José de Chila collapsed from an overflowing river. In Zamora, a large tree branch fell on several commercial stalls. Numerous dams exceeded their capacities. In the Infiernillo Dam, water levels rose to 9.652 billion cubic meters. In the La Villita dam, water levels rose to 552 million cubic meters. A disaster declaration was requested in 17 municipalities. In Morelia, a four-year-old boy was killed after falling into a river.

=== Elsewhere ===
In the State of Mexico and Colima, flooding, landslides, and fallen trees damaged numerous roads, forcing closures. In the State of Mexico, several landslides forced the evacuation of 75 homes. Downed power lines were also reported. However, no significant damage nor deaths were reported.

== Aftermath ==
Costliest Pacific hurricanes
| Rank | Cyclone | Season | Damage | Ref |
|---|---|---|---|---|
| 1 | 5 Otis | 2023 | $12–16 billion | |
| 2 | 1 Manuel | 2013 | $4.2 billion | |
| 3 | 4 Iniki | 1992 | $3.1 billion | |
| 4 | 3 John | 2024 | $2.45 billion | |
| 5 | 4 Odile | 2014 | $1.82 billion | |
| 6 | TS Agatha | 2010 | $1.1 billion | |
| 7 | 4 Hilary | 2023 | $948 million | |
| 8 | 5 Willa | 2018 | $825 million | |
| 9 | 1 Madeline | 1998 | $750 million | |
| 10 | 2 Rosa | 1994 | $700 million | |

Following the hurricane, the Mexican Navy activated Plan DN-III-E, a disaster relief and rescue plan, with 25,000 military units deployed to assist residents affected by John. At least 18,728 members of an international relief task force were sent to assist affected residents by the National Civil Protection Coordination. In the Costa Chica and Costa Grande regions, 5,000 people were placed in temporary storm shelters. The National Human Rights Commission donated Mex$70 million (US$3.73 million) to help those affected by the storm. Veterinary care and 1,700 kilograms of food were provided to support animals in shelters who were displaced by the storm. The World Central Kitchen distributed over 878,000 meals to those impacted by the hurricane.

In Guerrero, a total of Mex$5.75 billion (US$305 million) were given out to support families affected by the storm. The government allocated Mex1.8 billion (US$96.1 million) to reconstruct roads and bridges damaged by the storm. A total of 1,801 medical services were provided to those affected by the storm. In Acapulco, 58 garbage trucks were mobilized and a total of 10,000 tons of waste was disposed of. President Claudia Sheinbaum announced an 8 billion pesos (US$400 million) reconstruction plan to aid in rebuilding tourism and improving public services in Acapulco following the hurricane. Mex$14.5 million (US$770,000) were allocated to support farmers severely affected by the storm in 47 municipalities. Several people fell ill after contracting viruses from stagnant floodwaters.

In Oaxaca, where over 98,000 people lost power, 18,000 armed services members and government workers were deployed to assist in emergency response operations. A total of 2,383 food parcels, 870 sleeping mats, and 200 packs of water were delivered to communities severely affected by the storm. In 56 municipalities, 200 health centers were opened. Mex$350 million (US$18.7 million) were allocated to repair the damage caused by the storm. Seed banks were also provided to help farmers affected by the storm. Governor of Oaxaca Salomón Jara Cruz mobilized 37 vehicles to help repair damage to roads. A total of 762,000 cubic meters of soil was removed from mudslides and landslides. A total of Mex$358 million (US$19 million) was given out to support families affected by the storm.

== Retirement ==
Due to the extensive destruction and loss of life this storm caused, the name John was retired by the World Meteorological Organization during the 47th Session of the RA IV Hurricane Committee on April 2, 2025, and will never be used again for an Eastern Pacific hurricane. It will be replaced by Jake in the 2030 season.

== See also ==
- Weather of 2024
- Tropical cyclones in 2024
- List of Mexico hurricanes
- List of Category 3 Pacific hurricanes
- Timeline of the 2024 Pacific hurricane season
- Other storms of the same name
- Hurricane Otis (2023) - also rapidly intensified near the coast of Guerrero
- Hurricane Erick (2025) – Category 4 hurricane that made landfall at Punta Maldonado in Guerrero and which also underwent rapid intensification.
