= List of storms named John =

The name John has been used for nine tropical cyclones in the Eastern Pacific Ocean and two tropical cyclones in the Australian region.

In the Eastern Pacific:

- Hurricane John (1978) – Category 2 hurricane that did not affect land
- Hurricane John (1982) – Category 3 hurricane that never made landfall
- Tropical Storm John (1988) – affected the southern Baja California Peninsula
- Hurricane John (1994) (T9420, 10E) – Category 5 hurricane that was the furthest-traveling tropical cyclone; crossed into the Western Pacific Ocean, becoming a typhoon
- Tropical Storm John (2000) – strong tropical storm that did not affect land
- Hurricane John (2006) – Category 4 hurricane that made landfall in Baja California Sur
- Tropical Storm John (2012) – weak tropical storm that brought rain and wind to the Baja California Peninsula
- Hurricane John (2018) – Category 2 hurricane that affected Baja California Sur without making landfall
- Hurricane John (2024) – powerful and erratic Category 3 hurricane that caused devastating flooding in Guerrero and Oaxaca

The name John was retired after the 2024 season and replaced with Jake.

In the Australian region:

- Cyclone John (1989) – affected Cocos Island
- Cyclone John (1999) – made landfall in Western Australia

After the 1999–2000 season, the name John was retired from the Australian region naming lists.

== See also ==
Storms with similar names

- Storm Johannes (2025) – a European windstorm that caused three fatalities in Sweden; named the Latin equivalent of John
- List of storms named Juan – a similar name that has been used in two tropical cyclone basins; named the Spanish equivalent of John
