= List of Pacific hurricanes before 1900 =

List of Hurricanes before 1900

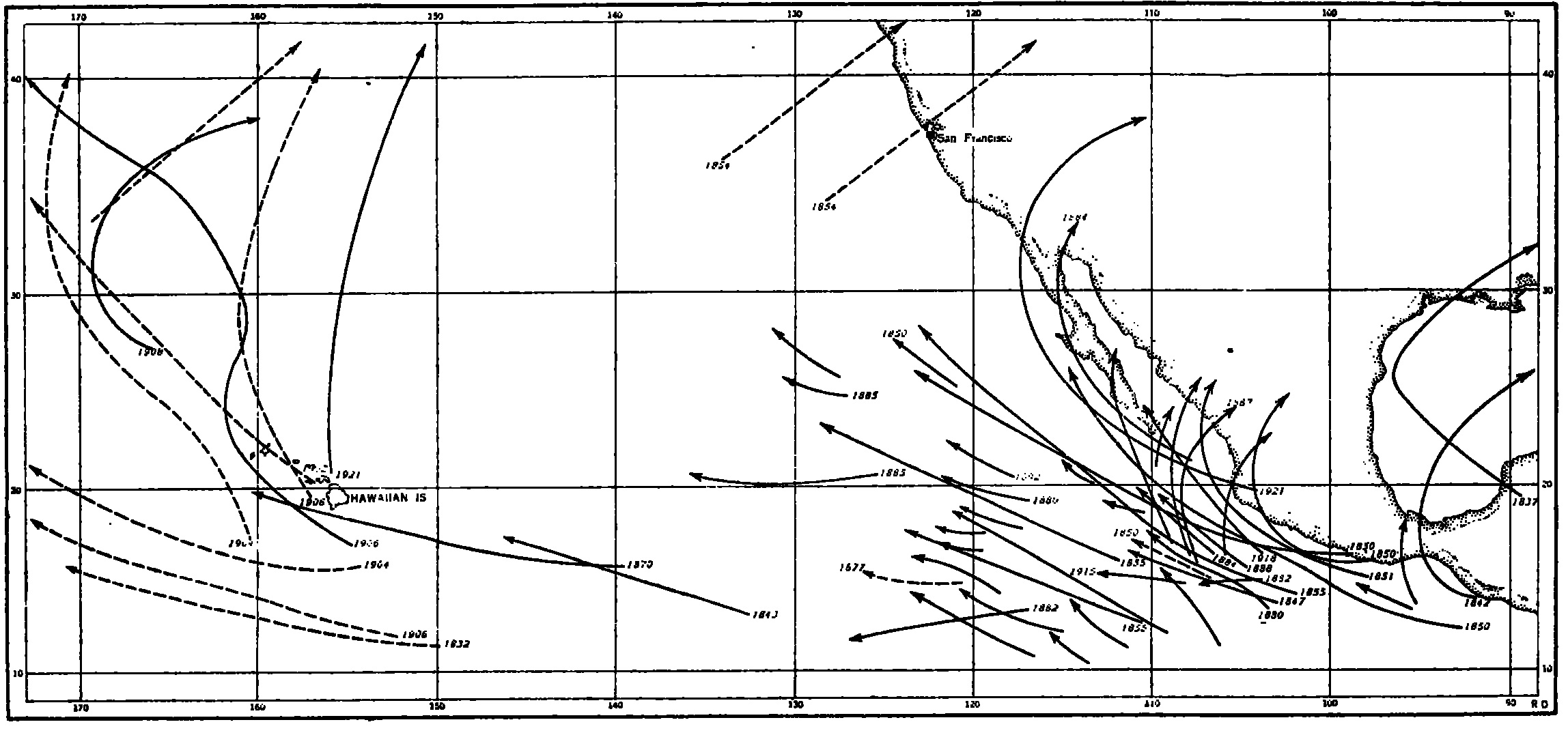
Track maps of Pacific hurricanes from 1832 to 1922

The following is a list of Pacific hurricanes before 1900. Data on most of the storms that formed is unavailable, however, some regions had a large enough coastal population or ship traffic to give data on the occurrence of hurricanes. Tropical cyclones in the region typically formed between May and November.

== Seasons ==
=== 1537 ===
A hurricane struck Tlapa in Guerrero, Mexico, producing strong winds, hail, excessive rains, and other natural phenomena. Juan Bautista Moya, an Augustinian missionary friar in Tlapa and Chilapa viewed this tempest as "a miraculous prodigy of the Lord to confirm his missionary preaching among the indigenous people. The wind unleashed over the town of Tlaba and lashed the countryside and cottages like a giant whip. The fury of the gale uprooted and demolished trees. Hail shattered the maize corn grains without pity. Successive earthquakes at quick intervals further terrorized the populace." In this and other cases, the "earthquakes" probably entered the records because the hurricane winds shook houses and other occupied buildings, and survivors likened the shaking to that of a continuous earthquake.

=== 1573 ===
On 14 November, a violent hurricane lasted 3 hours at Colima City in Mexico. Earthquakes accompanied the storm, and many houses along with the church building fell.

=== 1609 ===
A hurricane tore the cover off the church and ruined many houses in the town of Huaynamota in Jalisco, Mexico.

=== 1832 ===
In December 1832, according to a log from a German Merchant Marine vessel later left at Deutsche Seewarte, a tropical cyclone occurred southeast of the Hawaiian Islands; it then tracked west-northwestward, approaching 350 miles south of Ka Lae, Hawaii (island), and thence to a point near Johnston Atoll.

The new ship Japan encountered a "severe hurricane" near 13°N 160°W.

=== 1839 ===
On 1 November 1839, a destructive hurricane struck Mazatlán, Sinaloa, doing heavy damage to boats and watercraft; most of the twelve ships then in the harbor sunk with their crews.

=== 1840 ===
On November 1, a destructive hurricane did heavy damage to shipping and sunk three vessels at San Blas, Nayarit.

=== 1842 ===
A hurricane, between June and October, crossed the Isthmus of Tehuantepec and entered the Gulf of Mexico.

=== 1843 ===
I. The American barque Lark, sailing from Canton (now Guangzhou) for Valparaíso, experienced a "severe gale" on 23 September 1843 at 15°0′N 138°40′W. Afterwards, the master of this barque found necessary making port at Tahiti. The barque perhaps earlier encountered a violent typhoon off Formosa. German shipping logged this storm that day at 139°W. Someone later charted the storm to 17°N 147°W. These points suggest a trajectory toward the Big Island of Hawaii.

=== 1847 ===
A tropical cyclone existed On October 24 of this year.

=== 1849 ===
A system existed on June 21 and 22.

=== 1850 ===
Eight systems are recorded. I. One existed on an unknown date.

II. On or about 24 June 1850, the Joseph Butler encountered a "severe gale of wind" near 16°N 107°W, 260 miles from the coast of Mexico, which carried away her main-mast (sailing).

III. On 5 August 1850, the barque Como encountered a "severe gale" at 14°20′N 117°0′W, commencing at north and veering to west and south. She "lost sails and bulwarks and sustained much other damage." These winds suggest that the vessel traveled on the left side of the track of the storm, which passed to its northwest.

IV. On 9 September 1850, a "hurricane" at 15°16′N 99°50′W, about 90 miles (140 km) south of Acapulco, dismasted the Niagara.

For five hours on 11 September 1850, the Diana at 22°N 116°W experienced a "severe hurricane" from the northeast, veering to southwest; the vessel "hove on beam-ends." The veering intense wind suggests that the hurricane passed slightly northwest of the vessel, which experienced the left side. If a hurricane progressed from Niagara to Diana (and the ships logged their dates accurately), then the hurricane moved between west-northwest and northwest at 23 miles per hour (37 km/h).

V. On 26 September 1850, a "severe gale" at 26°N 123°W threw the Laura on her beam-ends, and she lost cargo.

VI. On 3 October 1850, the brig Amazon, sailing from New York northward for San Francisco, encountered a "severe hurricane" at 13°30′N 116°50′W. A passenger on the brig published an account of this storm. Heavy rain accompanied squalls from southwest, which increased in frequency and intensity until 5 pm, when a "hurricane" commenced with the brig under reefing fore-topsail and mainsail. The captain "scudded" the vessel, putting her before the blast. The tempest raged through the night with momentarily increased fury. The wind veered from southwesterly to southerly to southeasterly to easterly to northeasterly to northerly to westerly to southwesterly, making the circuit of "thirty-four points" of the compass in 6 hours. This account suggests a small, violent hurricane moving less than 4 miles per hour (6.4 km/h); the Amazon probably actually overtook the hurricane from its southeastern quadrant and traveled through the eyewall almost completely around the eye of the storm.

At 4 am on 4 October 1850, the hurricane blew the foresail of the brig Amazon from the yard (sailing) and then brought the vessel to the wind, which blew her directly down on her side or beam-ends. Captain Watt then ordered her put again before the wind, but the crew did not succeed in executing this order. The crew then let the main-topsail go; she "dashed away like lightning before the tempest." The crew kept her "scudding" until the hurricane abated and then laid her in a heavy gale from the southwest. The vessel reported a position of 13°40′N 116°30′W and thereafter drifted likely in a direction opposite the progression of the storm through a prolonged gale. Captain Watt described the gale as equally severe as those in the West Indies. This offshore hurricane occurred contemporaneously with the next succeeding hurricane.

VII. Reports from 1–6 October 1850 suggest that a "gale...with great violence" swept the whole Mexican coast.

On 1 October 1850, a "severe gale" threw the Kingston, traveling from San Francisco for Panama City, on beam-ends, off the Mexican coast at 14°N. The Belgrade, voyaging from San Francisco for El Realejo, recorded a fine breeze from the west-northwest and heavy swell from the southeast. At 10 AM, the wind hauled suddenly to southeast with increased force and squally appearances.

At midnight on 1/2 October, the Belgrade sailed under reefing topsails. On the same route from San Francisco for El Realejo, the Galindo experienced a "severe hurricane," which threw her on beam-ends and dismasted her.

At 1 AM on 2 October, the wind against the Belgrade increased still with vivid lightning and heavy rain. At 4 am, the storm split the fore-topsail. At 8 am, the vessel lost her foresail, and the gale increased to a "hurricane," which threw her on beam-ends with loss of main and mizzen topmasts with the head of the mainmast, when the ship righted a little. At 1 pm on 2 October, the hurricane still increased with the ship on her beam-ends; she lost her fore-topmast with much other damage.

At midnight on 2/3 October, the wind blew as hard as ever against the Belgrade; at 4 am on 3 October, the wind moderated with heavy rain.

On 4 October, the Belgrade reported a position of 18°11′N 104°05′W and made for Acapulco. Given the southeasterly hurricane, she probably had passed to the right of the west-moving storm, which passed to her south. The Belgrade and Galindo arrived at Acapulco at the same time.

On 5 October off Cabo San Lucas, a "violent hurricane" threw the Lavina on beam-ends, and she lay twenty-one hours.

On 5/6 October, "the gale" damaged the Fanny, voyaging from Mazatlán for San Francisco; she put back to Mazatlán.

This hurricane apparently progressed northwestward at less than 8 miles per hour (13 km/h).

VIII. One existed on an unknown date in October.

=== 1851 ===
Three systems are recorded. They existed on September 16, October 21, and some time in October.

=== 1852 ===
A system was reported from July 16 to 19.

=== 1854 ===
A tropical cyclone existed on October 3.

Before June or after October of this year, a system considered a tropical cyclone made landfall just north of the Golden Gate.

=== 1855 ===
Seven systems are recorded. One existed in June and two in August from the third to sixth and eighth through ninth days of that month respectively. Another was recorded on September 4.

=== 1857 ===
Two tropical cyclones existed, on June 20 and September 6.

=== 1858 ===
A system was recorded on August 17.

On October 2, the 1858 San Diego hurricane caused heavy damage in southern California.

On November 21, a cyclone was reported at a location of 21°N 174°W.

=== 1859 ===
A tropical cyclone existed on September 10.

Before June or after October, a system considered a tropical cyclone made landfall in northern California.

=== 1865 ===
A system existed on July 25.

=== 1870 ===
On June 17, German shipping logs reported a tropical cyclone.

From September 21 to September 24, German shipping logs reported a tropical cyclone, with a path running northwest from near 17°N 141°W to close to the Big Island to near 19°N 160°W.

=== 1871 ===
A system was recorded by German shipping logs on July 3.

On July 10, a storm of unknown strength was encountered by the USS Jamestown. There was a moderate gale, rain, squalls, diving barometer, choppy seas, and winds that changed direction in a counter clockwise manner.

On August 9, an intense hurricane struck Hawaii. Heavy rains flooded a plantation on the Big Island, causing around $5,000 (equivalent to $134,375 in 2025) in damage. Trees were blown down. On Maui, there was considerable damage to trees and buildings. Significant damage was reported by indigenous newspapers on both islands with the accounts suggesting a major category 3 hurricane.

=== 1874 ===
From November 17 to November 20, German shipping records recorded a cyclone. This may have actually been a type of seasonal extratropical system known as a Kona storm.

=== 1876 ===
Atlantic Hurricane 4, which had made landfall in southern Nicaragua on October 3 as a category 2, survived passage over Central America and emerged into the Pacific Ocean as a tropical storm on October 4. It dissipated or was lost track of on October 3. While in the Pacific, this hurricane hassled and damaged a ship, the Costa Rica.

=== 1877 ===
A tropical cyclone existed on November 5.

=== 1880 ===
Two tropical cyclones were reported. They existed on July 6 and October 13.

=== 1881 ===
In late September, a hurricane with winds estimated near 110 knots struck Mazatlán.

On the late afternoon of October 27, a major hurricane with estimated winds of 110 knots hit Manzanillo. The lowest measured pressure was 28 inches of mercury (950 mb). This hurricane completely destroyed the city. In Manzanillo Harbor, a ship, a bark, two schooners, several small boats, and numerous lighters were total losses. The total damage exceeded $500,000.

=== 1882 ===
In July, a cyclone was reported near the location 13°N, 118°W. It may have been traveling southwestward.

On September 7, German shipping logs recorded the existence of a tropical cyclone.

=== 1883 ===
Two tropical cyclones existed, from September 21 to 23 and on October 3. Including one that struck Mexico

=== 1884 ===
Two tropical cyclones are known. One existed from September 28 to 30, the other on October 23.

=== 1885 ===
Four systems existed, on July 31, September 12, October 5 to 6, and October 25.

=== 1886 ===
A system was recorded on September 19 by German shipping logs.

=== 1887 ===
On July 6 and from October 3 to 6, two tropical cyclones were recorded.

=== 1888 ===
Four systems are known. They existed on August 9 to 10, August 13 to 14, September 10 to 11, and September 20.

=== 1889 ===
The one tropical cyclone known this year existed on August 2 and 3.

=== 1890 ===
A tropical cyclone existed on August 18 and 19.

=== 1891 ===
On 2 August, a cyclone existed.

Another existed five days later, on 7 August, when a very destructive severe storm in Gulf of California and Baja California Territory lasted several days.

On 11 August 1891, a severe thunderstorm occurred at and about San Bernardino, California, where lightning struck and burned a barn. It burned out telegraph instruments at Riverside, California. Very heavy rain fell in the mountains east of Redlands, California, flooded a considerable extent country, and much damaged orchards. On 12 August 1891, extreme rainfall fell at Campo, California—11.50 inches (292 mm) in 80 minutes before the cloudburst carried away the rain gauge. At least 16.10 inches fell that month at the station. This rain caused destructive floods over portions of San Diego County, California. These floods may or may not have been related to the preceding cyclone.

=== 1892 ===
A system existed on July 19.

=== 1895 ===
On October 1, a cyclone first spotted on September 29 made landfall in Mexico, having rapidly moved north for its short life. It caused much loss of life and property damage.

On November 1, unusual waves were reported at Sausalito, California. These have been attributed to a tropical cyclone.

=== 1899 ===
A cyclone, which passed near the Revillagigedo Islands, was first spotted southwest of Manzanillo on August 26, before it paralleled the coast from August 29 to August 31. The "tropical hurricane" made landfall on the night of September 1 before moving into mainland Mexico.

A cyclone moved west-northwest well south and southwest of Baja California from September 2 to September 6 of this year.

== See also ==
- Atlantic hurricane season
- Pacific hurricane season
- Pacific typhoon season
- Pre-1890 North Indian Ocean cyclone seasons
