= Fones =

Fones may refer to:

- Fones (surname)
- Fones House, a historic house in Little Rock, Arkansas, U.S.
- HearFones, an acoustic, non-electronic instrument
