= Hones =

Hones is a surname. Notable people with the surname include:

- Alexander Hones – Austrian association football player
- J.J. Hones (born 1987), American basketball player
- Josef Hones (born 1954), Austrian ski mountaineer and biathlete

Hones can also refer to:

- Hones, a cultivar of Karuka

== See also ==
- Hone
