= Fone =

Fone may refer to:

- A misspelling of phone, short for telephone
- The given name of Fone Bone, the main character of the Bone comics series

== People with the surname ==
- Steve Fone (born 1987), English ice-hockey player
- Byrne Fone, author of 2000 book Homophobia: A History

== See also ==
- Fones (disambiguation)
