= Timeline of the 2024 Pacific hurricane season =

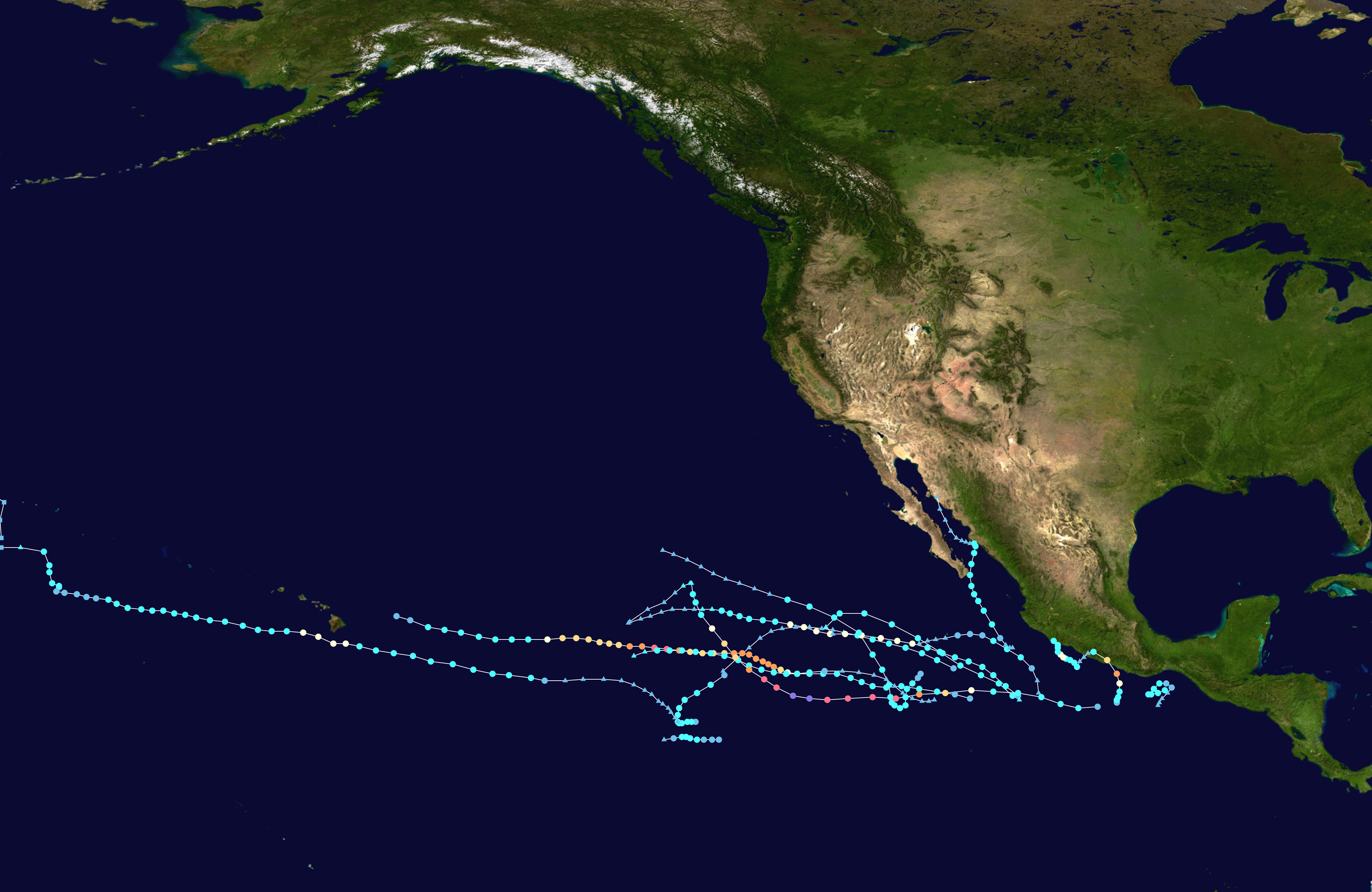
- Season summary map

Season boundaries
- First system formed: July 4, 2024
- Last system dissipated: November 7, 2024

Strongest system
- Name: Kristy
- Maximum winds: 160 mph (260 km/h)
- Lowest pressure: 926 mbar (hPa; 27.35 inHg)

Longest lasting system
- Name: Gilma
- Duration: 11.75 days
Storm articles
- Hurricane Hone
- Hurricane John

The 2024 Pacific hurricane season was the annual cycle of tropical cyclone formation over the Pacific Ocean north of the equator and east of the International Date Line (IDL). The season officially began on May 15 in the Eastern Pacific proper (east of 140°W) and June 1 in the Central Pacific (140°W to the IDL), and ended on November 30 in both areas. This is historically the period during which most tropical cyclogenesis occurs in these respective areas. The season's first system, Tropical Storm Aletta, developed on July 4, marking the latest start to a season since the satellite era began in 1966. The season's final system, Tropical Depression Fourteen-E, dissipated on November 7.

Tropical cyclone activity was generally below average during the 2024 season. (Note: An average Pacific hurricane season, as defined by the National Hurricane Center, generates fifteen named storms, with eight becoming hurricanes and four becoming major hurricanes.) A total of fourteen nameable tropical storms developed, with five becoming hurricanes and three intensifying into major hurricanes—Category 3 or higher on the five-level Saffir–Simpson scale. Two systems—hurricanes Gilma and Hone—existed in the Central Pacific basin. A fifteenth tropical depression formed that did not reach tropical storm strength. Hurricane John was the only tropical cyclone to make landfall this season, doing so twice in Mexico—first as a Category 3 hurricane, then as a tropical storm. John's slow movement near and over mountainous terrain resulted in prolonged heavy rainfall, which in turn caused catastrophic flooding that was estimated to have killed twenty-nine people and wrought US$2.45 billion in damage.

This timeline documents tropical cyclone formations, strengthening, weakening, landfalls, and dissipations during the season. It includes information that was not released throughout the season, meaning that data from post-storm reviews by the National Hurricane Center has been included.

The time stamp for each event is first stated using Coordinated Universal Time (UTC), the 24-hour clock where 00:00 = midnight UTC. The NHC uses both UTC and the time zone where the center of the tropical cyclone is currently located. The time zones utilized (east to west) are: Central, Mountain, Pacific and Hawaii. In this timeline, the respective area time is included in parentheses. Additionally, figures for maximum sustained winds and position estimates are rounded to the nearest 5 units (miles, or kilometers), following National Hurricane Center practice. Direct wind observations are rounded to the nearest whole number. Atmospheric pressures are listed to the nearest millibar and nearest hundredth of an inch of mercury.

== Timeline ==
=== May ===
- No tropical cyclones form in the Eastern Pacific basin during the month of May.

May 15

- The 2024 Eastern Pacific hurricane season officially begins.

=== June ===
- No tropical cyclones form in the Eastern or Central Pacific basins during the month of June.

June 1

- The 2024 Central Pacific hurricane season officially begins.

=== July ===
July 4

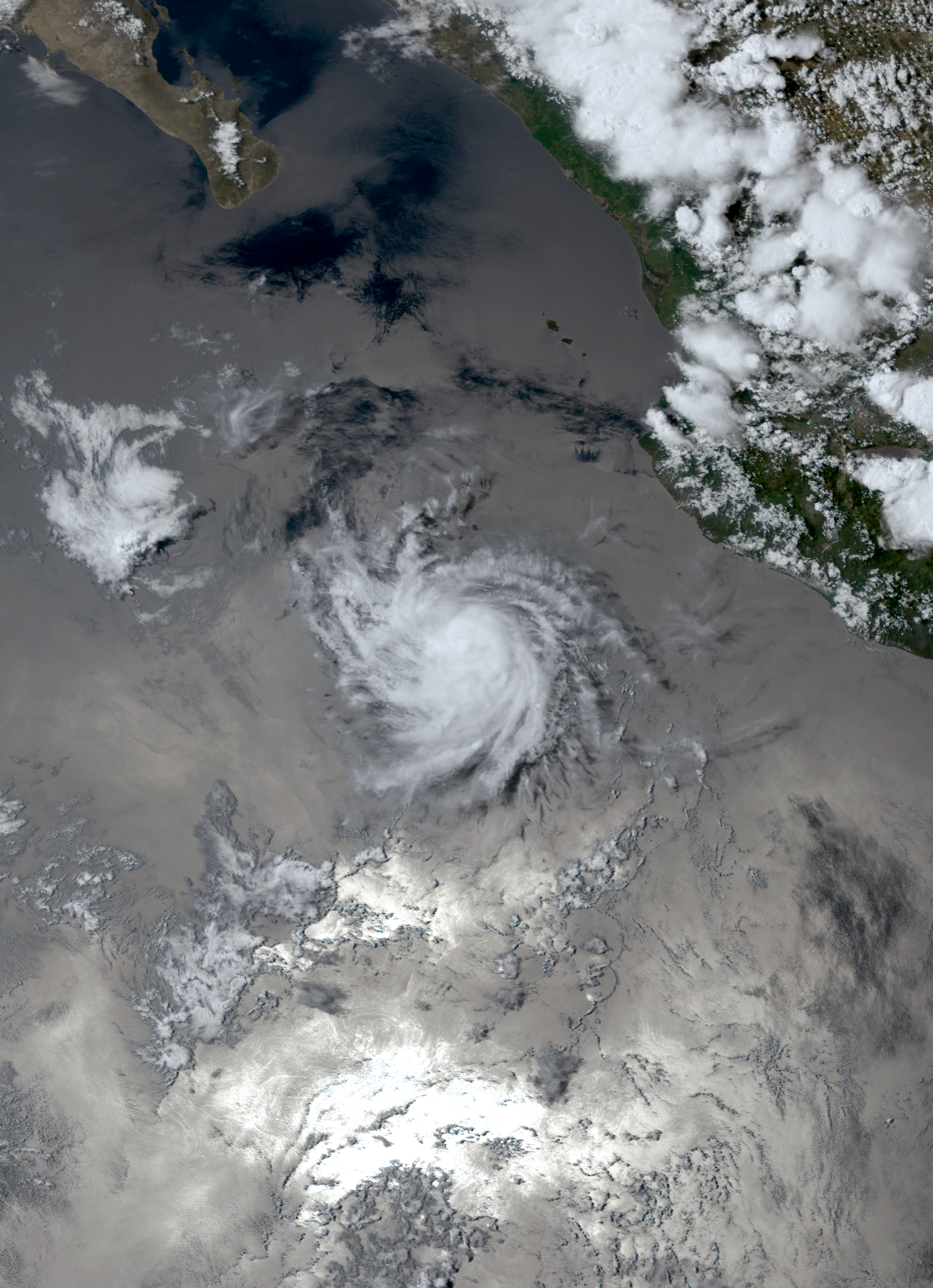
Tropical Storm Aletta at peak intensity late on July 4

- 06:00 UTC (12:00 a.m. CST) at 16.3°N 104.8°W – Tropical Depression One-E forms from a tropical wave about 230 mi (370 km) south of Manzanillo, Colima.
- 12:00 UTC (6:00 a.m. CST) at 17.1°N 105.6°W – Tropical Depression One-E strengthens into Tropical Storm Aletta about 160 mi (260 km) south-southwest of Manzanillo; it simultaneously reaches its peak intensity, with maximum sustained winds of 40 mph (65 km/h) and a minimum barometric pressure of 1005 mbar (29.68 inHg).

July 5

- 06:00 UTC (11:00 p.m. MST, July 4) at 18.7°N 108.4°W – Tropical Storm Aletta weakens into a tropical depression about 270 mi (435 km) west of Manzanillo.

July 6

- 00:00 UTC (5:00 p.m. MST, July 5) at 18.5°N 111.1°W – Tropical Depression Aletta degenerates into a remnant low about 445 mi (715 km) west of Manzanillo, and later dissipates.

July 24

- 12:00 UTC (5:00 a.m. MST) at 16.3°N 110.5°W – The second tropical depression of the season forms from an area of unsettled weather about 460 mi (740 km) south of Cabo San Lucas, Baja California Sur.
- 18:00 UTC (11:00 a.m. MST) at 16.9°N 111.7°W – The second tropical depression of the season strengthens into Tropical Storm Bud about 430 mi (695 km) south-southwest of Cabo San Lucas.

July 25

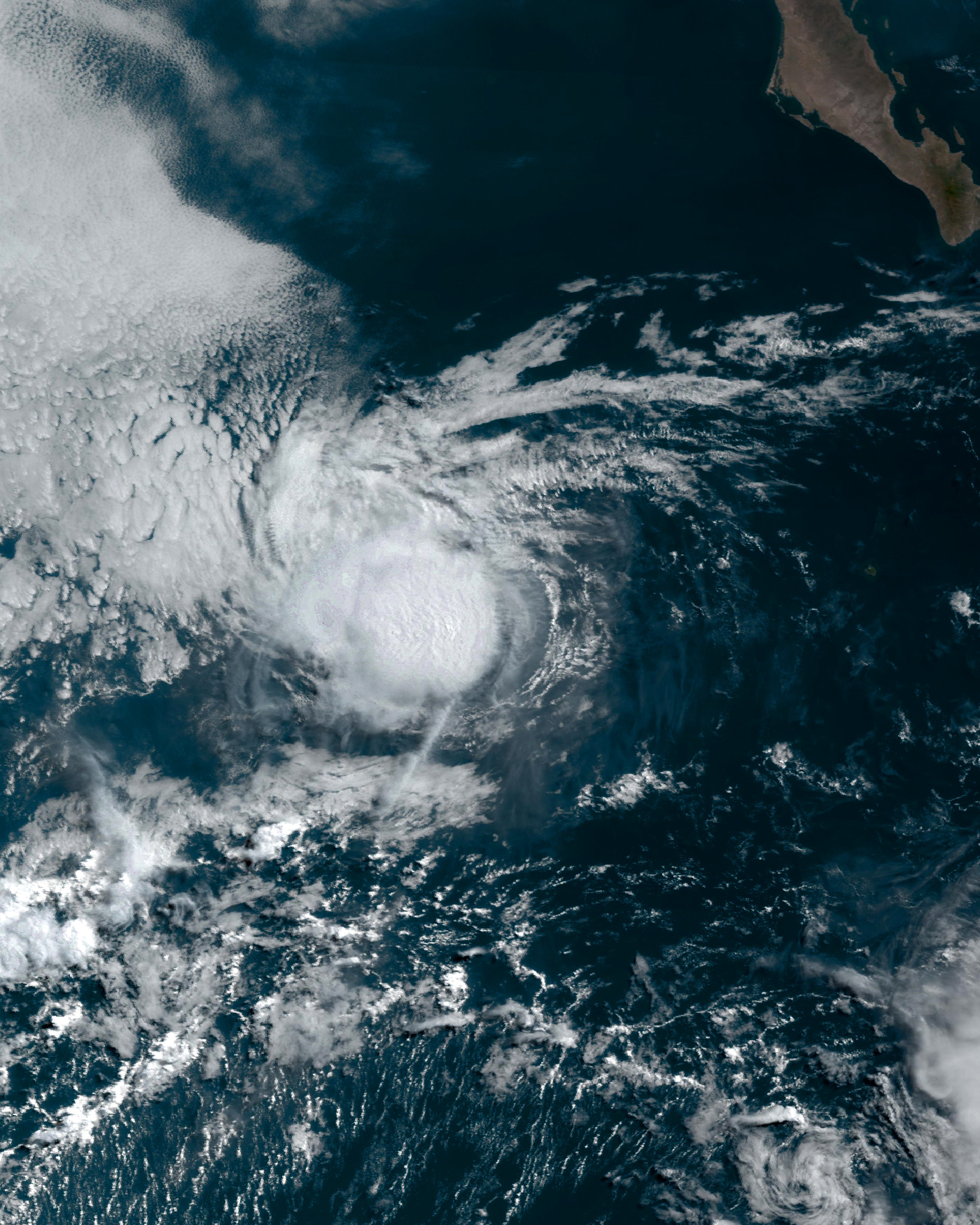
Tropical Storm Bud near peak intensity on July 25

- 06:00 UTC (11:00 p.m. MST, July 24) at 17.8°N 114.0°W – Tropical Storm Bud reaches its peak intensity, with maximum sustained winds of 60 mph (95 km/h) and a minimum barometric pressure of 1001 mbar (29.56 inHg), about 435 mi (705 km) southwest of Cabo San Lucas.

July 26

- 06:00 UTC (11:00 p.m. PDT, July 25) at 18.9°N 118.5°W – Tropical Storm Bud degenerates into a post-tropical cyclone about 615 mi (990 km) west-southwest of Cabo San Lucas, and subsequently dissipates.

July 31

- 06:00 UTC (11:00 p.m. MST, July 30) at 14.3°N 105.8°W – Tropical Depression Three-E forms from a tropical wave 405 mi (650 km) south-southwest of Manzanillo, Colima.
- 12:00 UTC (5:00 a.m. MST) at 15.0°N 106.7°W – Tropical Depression Three-E strengthens into Tropical Storm Carlotta about 320 mi (520 km) south-southwest of Manzanillo.

=== August ===
August 2

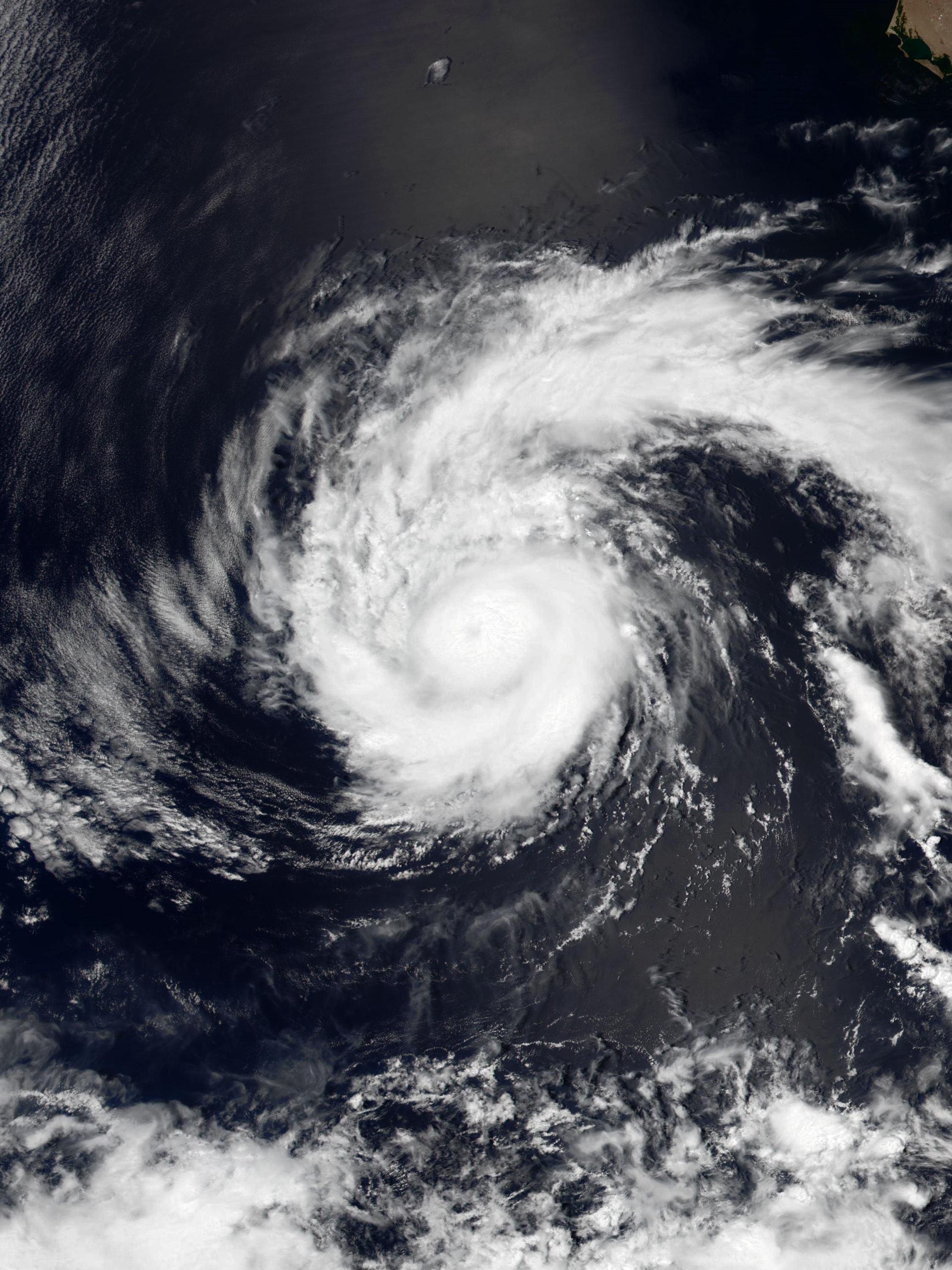
Hurricane Carlotta on August 2

- 06:00 UTC (11:00 p.m. MST, August 1) at 18.1°N 113.5°W – Tropical Storm Carlotta strengthens into a Category 1 hurricane about 80 mi (130 km) east-southeast of Clarion Island.

August 3

- 00:00 UTC (5:00 p.m. PDT, August 2) at 12.4°N 129.3°W – The fourth tropical depression of the season forms from an area of unsettled weather about 1,460 mi (2,350 km) west-southwest of the southern tip of the Baja California peninsula.
- 06:00 UTC (11:00 p.m. PDT, August 2) at 18.8°N 118.4°W – Hurricane Carlotta reaches its peak intensity, with maximum sustained winds of 90 mph (150 km/h) and a minimum barometric pressure of 979 mbar (28.91 inHg), about 240 mi (390 km) west of Clarion Island.
- 06:00 UTC (11:00 p.m. PDT, August 2) at 12.4°N 129.6°W – The fourth tropical depression of the season strengthens into Tropical Storm Daniel about 1,480 mi (2,380 km) west-southwest of the southern tip of the Baja California peninsula.

August 4

- 12:00 UTC (5:00 a.m. PDT) at 19.7°N 123.5°W – Hurricane Carlotta weakens into a tropical storm about 580 mi (935 km) west of Clarion Island.
- 12:00 UTC (5:00 a.m. MST) at 15.9°N 112.9°W – Tropical Depression Five-E forms from an area of low pressure about 605 mi (975 km) west-southwest of Manzanillo, Colima.
- 18:00 UTC (11:00 a.m. PDT) at 13.4°N 130.5°W – Tropical Storm Daniel reaches its peak intensity, with maximum sustained winds of 40 mph (65 km/h) and a minimum barometric pressure of 1005 mbar (29.68 inHg), about 1,495 mi (2,410 km) west-southwest of the southern tip of the Baja California peninsula.

August 5

- 00:00 UTC (5:00 p.m. MST, August 4) at 15.2°N 113.5°W – Tropical Depression Five-E strengthens into Tropical Storm Emilia about 660 mi (1,065 km) west-southwest of Manzanillo.
- 12:00 UTC (5:00 a.m. MST) at 14.3°N 106.2°W – Tropical Storm Fabio forms from an area of low pressure about 350 mi (565 km) south-southwest of Manzanillo.
- 18:00 UTC (11:00 a.m. PDT) at 15.8°N 127.2°W – Tropical Storm Daniel weakens into a tropical depression about 1,225 mi (1,970 km) west-southwest of the southern tip of the Baja California peninsula, and subsequently dissipates.

August 6

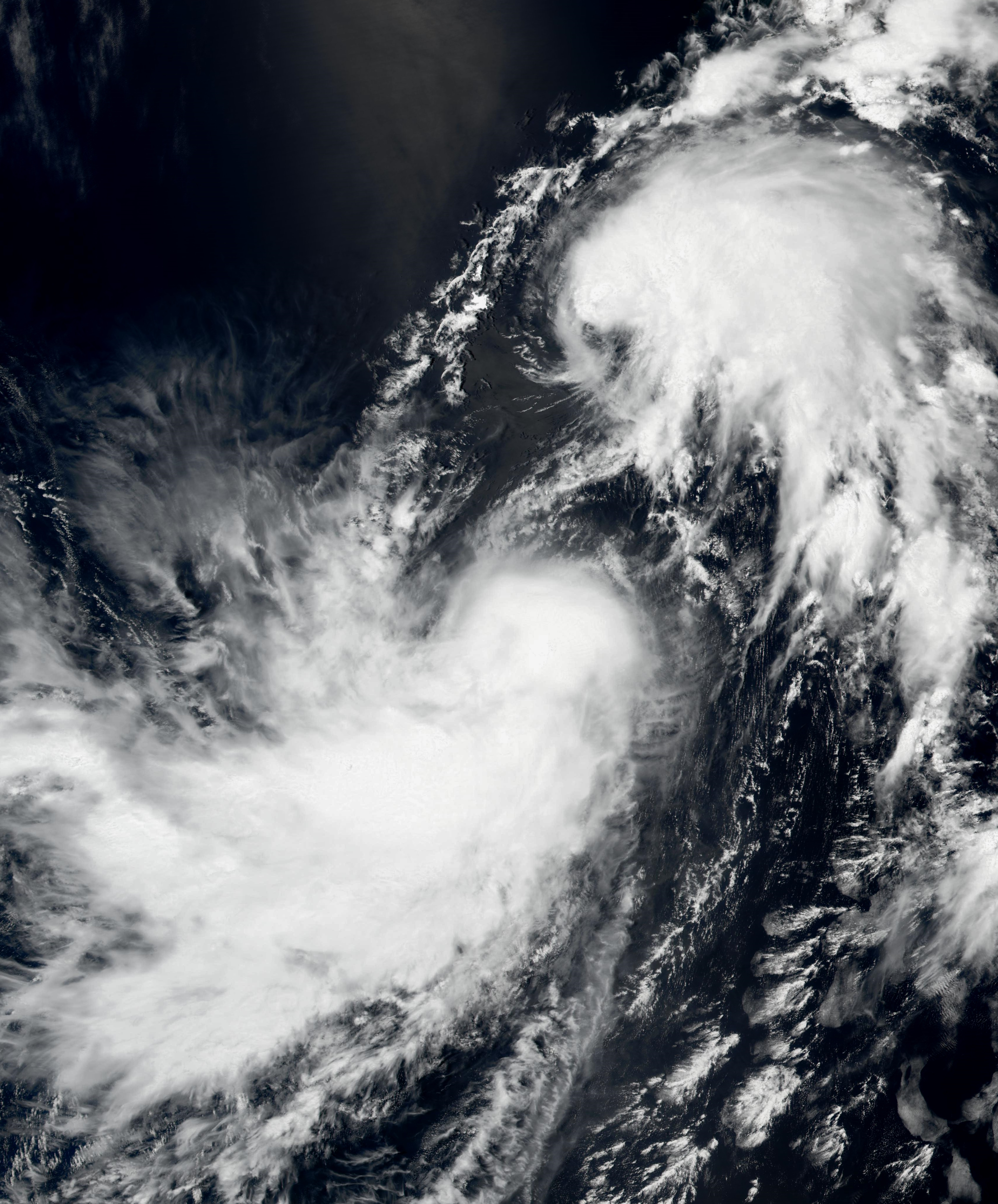
Tropical storms Emilia (bottom) and Fabio (top) late on August 6

- 00:00 UTC (5:00 p.m. PDT, August 5) at 20.6°N 128.1°W – Tropical Storm Carlotta degenerates into a post-tropical cyclone about 885 mi (1,425 km) west of Clarion Island, and subsequently dissipates.
- 12:00 UTC (5:00 a.m. MST) at 17.5°N 111.5°W – Tropical Storm Fabio reaches its peak intensity, with maximum sustained winds of 65 mph (100 km/h) and a minimum barometric pressure of 996 mbar (29.41 inHg), about 485 mi (780 km) west-southwest of Manzanillo.

August 7

- 06:00 UTC (11:00 p.m. PDT, August 6) at 16.2°N 115.7°W – Tropical Storm Emilia reaches its peak intensity, with maximum sustained winds of 70 mph (110 km/h) and a minimum barometric pressure of 988 mbar (29.18 inHg), about 775 mi (1,250 km) west-southwest of Manzanillo.
- 18:00 UTC (11:00 a.m. PDT) at 19.3°N 119.8°W – Tropical Storm Fabio transitions to a post-tropical cyclone about 1,005 mi (1,620 km) west of Manzanillo, and is subsequently absorbed by Tropical Storm Emilia.

August 8

- 18:00 UTC (11:00 a.m. PDT) at 21.7°N 123.9°W – Tropical Storm Emilia degenerates into a remnant low about 1,280 mi (2,055 km) west of Manzanillo.

August 18

- 06:00 UTC (11:00 p.m. MST, August 17) at 14.1°N 109.3°W – Tropical Depression Seven-E forms from an interaction between a tropical wave and the monsoon trough about 610 mi (980 km) south of the southern tip of the Baja California peninsula.
- 18:00 UTC (11:00 a.m. MST) at 14.6°N 111.7°W – Tropical Depression Seven-E strengthens into Tropical Storm Gilma about 580 mi (935 km) south of the southern tip of the Baja California peninsula.

August 21

- 06:00 UTC (11:00 p.m. PDT, August 20) at 15.9°N 121.9°W – Tropical Storm Gilma strengthens into a Category 1 hurricane about 915 mi (1,475 km) west-southwest of the southern tip of the Baja California peninsula.
- 18:00 UTC (11:00 a.m. PDT) at 16.2°N 123.1°W – Hurricane Gilma strengthens to Category 2 intensity about 975 mi (1,565 km) west-southwest of the southern tip of the Baja California peninsula.

August 22

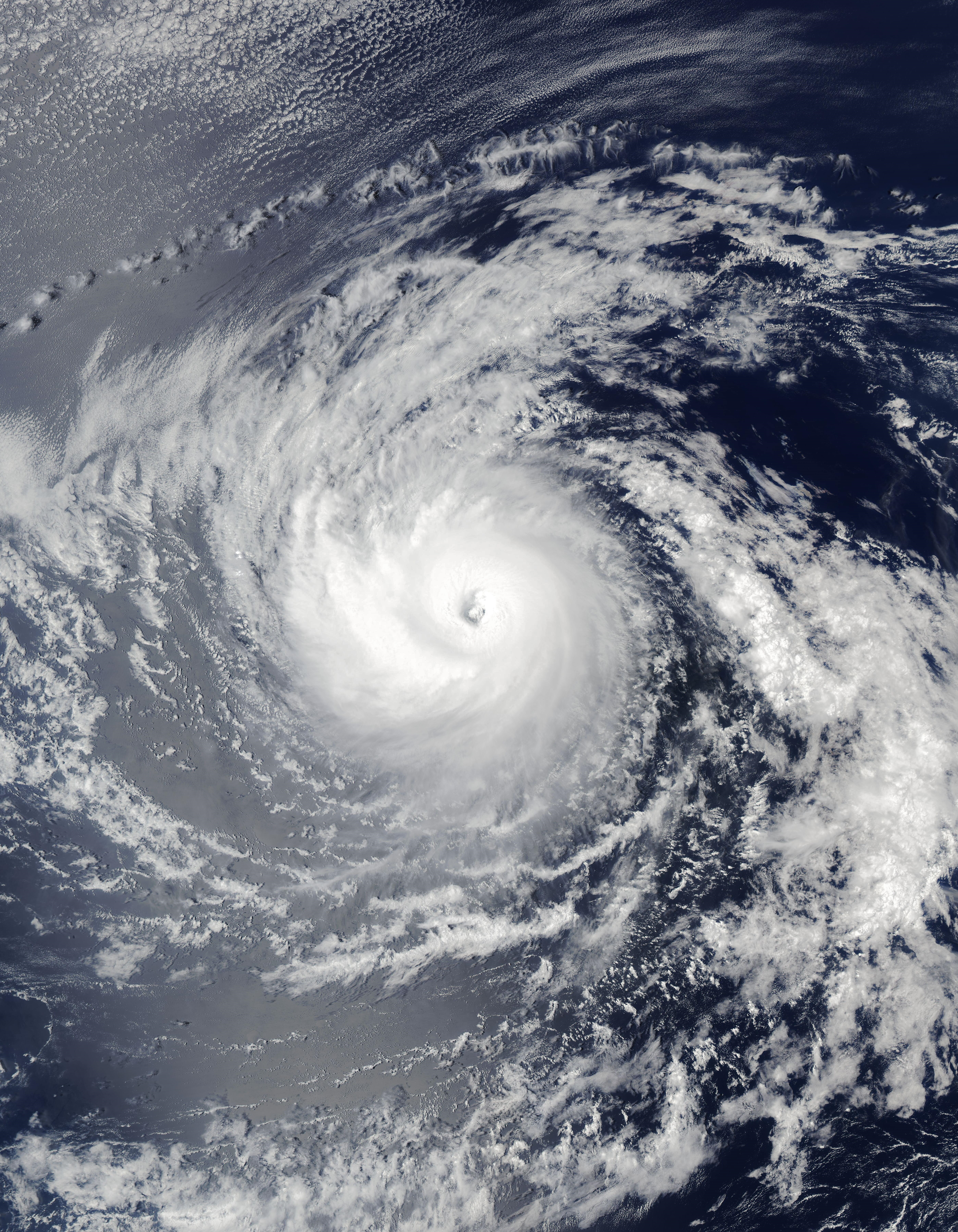
Hurricane Gilma near its initial peak intensity late on August 22

- 00:00 UTC (5:00 p.m. PDT, August 21) at 16.4°N 123.6°W – Hurricane Gilma strengthens to Category 3 intensity about 990 mi (1,595 km) west-southwest of the southern tip of the Baja California peninsula, making it the first major hurricane of the season.
- 00:00 UTC (5:00 p.m. PDT, August 21) at 15.5°N 137.5°W – Tropical Depression One-C (Note: Operationally, the Central Pacific Hurricane Center did not initiate advisories on Tropical Depression One-C—future Hurricane Hone—until after the system had crossed 140°W.) forms about 1,190 mi (1,920 km) east-southeast of Hilo, Hawaii.
- 12:00 UTC (5:00 a.m. PDT) at 16.8°N 124.4°W – Hurricane Gilma reaches its initial peak intensity, with maximum sustained winds of 125 mph (205 km/h) and a barometric pressure of 954 mbar (28.17 inHg), about 1,035 mi (1,665 km) west-southwest of the southern tip of the Baja California peninsula.
- 18:00 UTC (8:00 a.m. HST) at 15.5°N 141.5°W – Tropical Depression One-C strengthens into Tropical Storm Hone about 940 mi (1,510 km) east-southeast of Hilo.

August 23

- 18:00 UTC (11:00 a.m. PDT) at 17.4°N 127.2°W – Hurricane Gilma weakens to Category 2 intensity about 1,180 mi (1,900 km) west-southwest of the southern tip of the Baja California peninsula.

August 24

- 18:00 UTC (11:00 a.m. PDT) at 17.6°N 130.5°W – Hurricane Gilma restrengthens to Category 3 intensity about 1,380 mi (2,225 km) west-southwest of the southern tip of the Baja California peninsula.

August 25

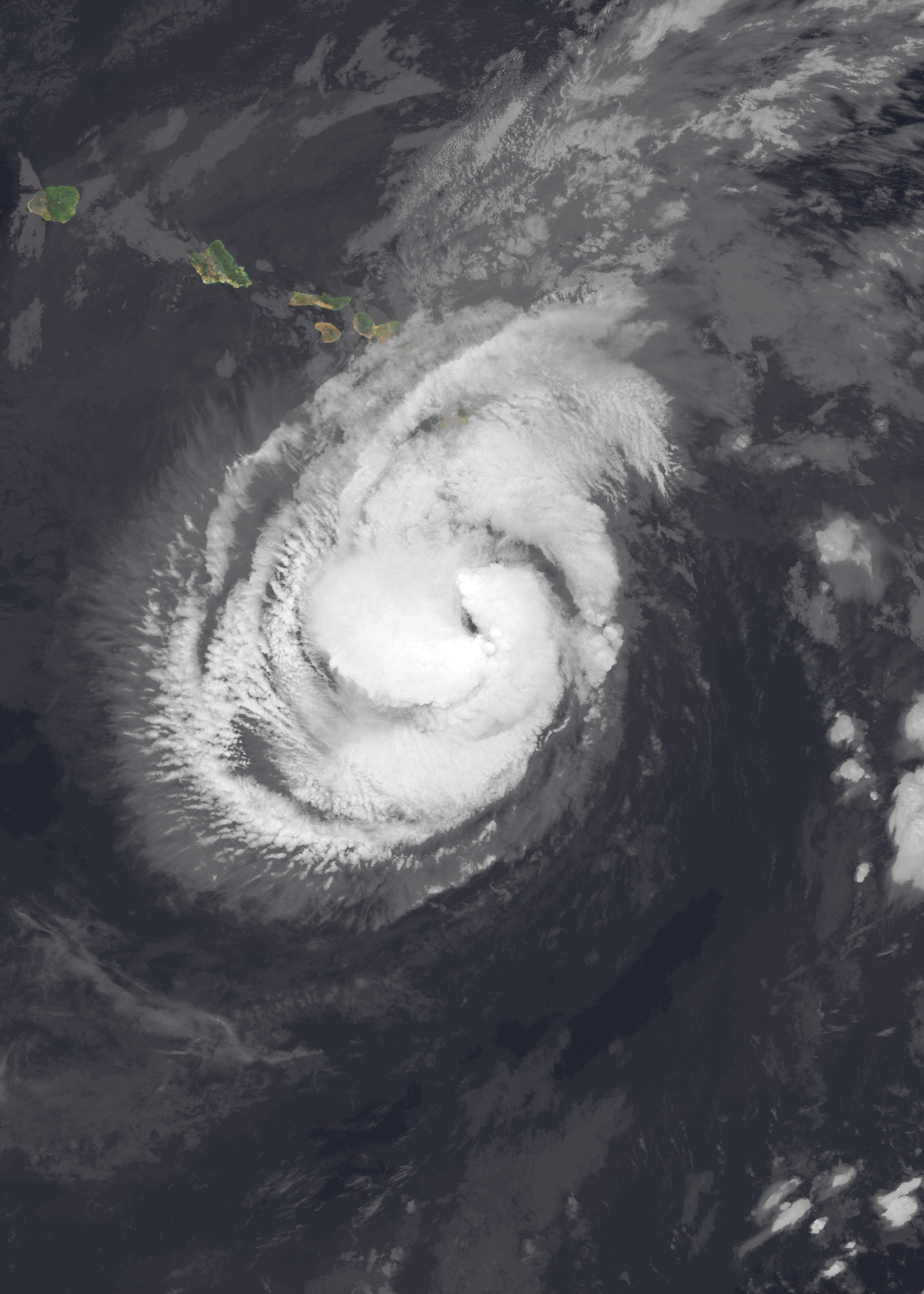
Hurricane Hone near peak intensity on August 25

- 00:00 UTC (2:00 p.m. HST, August 24) at 17.7°N 131.4°W – Hurricane Gilma strengthens to Category 4 intensity about 1,435 mi (2,305 km) west-southwest of the southern tip of the Baja California peninsula. It simultaneously reaches its peak intensity, with maximum sustained winds of 130 mph (215 km/h) and a minimum barometric pressure of 950 mbar (28.05 inHg).
- 06:00 UTC (8:00 p.m. HST, August 24) at 18.1°N 154.8°W – Tropical Storm Hone strengthens into a Category 1 hurricane about 115 mi (185 km) south of Hilo.
- 06:00 UTC (11:00 p.m. PDT, August 24) at 16.1°N 119.9°W – The eighth tropical depression of the season forms from an area of low pressure about 800 mi (1,290 km) southwest of the southern tip of the Baja California peninsula.
- 12:00 UTC (5:00 a.m. PDT) at 17.9°N 133.2°W – Hurricane Gilma weakens to Category 3 intensity about 1,540 mi (2,485 km) west of the southern tip of the Baja California peninsula.
- 12:00 UTC (2:00 a.m. HST) at 18.2°N 155.7°W – Hurricane Hone reaches its peak intensity, with maximum sustained winds of 85 mph (140 km/h) and a minimum barometric pressure of 988 mbar (29.18 inHg), about 50 mi (85 km) south of South Point, Hawaii.
- 12:00 UTC (5:00 a.m. PDT) at 16.0°N 121.0°W – The eighth tropical depression of the season strengthens into Tropical Storm Hector about 865 mi (1,390 km) southwest of the southern tip of the Baja California peninsula.

August 26

- 00:00 UTC (5:00 p.m. PDT, August 25) at 18.1°N 135.1°W – Hurricane Gilma weakens to Category 2 intensity about 1,645 mi (2,650 km) west of the southern tip of the Baja California peninsula.
- 00:00 UTC (2:00 p.m. HST, August 25) at 19.0°N 157.9°W – Hurricane Hone weakens into a tropical storm about 160 mi (260 km) south of Honolulu, Hawaii.

August 27

- 00:00 UTC (5:00 p.m. PDT, August 26) at 16.9°N 126.2°W – Tropical Storm Hector reaches its peak intensity, with maximum sustained winds of 60 mph (95 km/h) and a minimum barometric pressure of 998 mbar (29.47 inHg), about 1,135 mi (1,825 km) west-southwest of the southern tip of the Baja California peninsula.
- 12:00 UTC (2:00 a.m. HST) at 18.5°N 140.2°W – Hurricane Gilma weakens to Category 1 intensity about 1,975 mi (3,180 km) west of the southern tip of the Baja California peninsula, shortly after crossing over into the Central Pacific basin.
- 18:00 UTC (8:00 a.m. HST) at 18.4°N 141.5°W – Hurricane Gilma weakens into a tropical storm about 2,060 mi (3,315 km) west of the southern tip of the Baja California peninsula.

August 28

- 18:00 UTC (11:00 a.m. PDT) at 17.5°N 133.0°W – Tropical Storm Hector degenerates into a post-tropical cyclone about 1,535 mi (2,475 km) west-southwest of the southern tip of the Baja California peninsula.

August 29

- 12:00 UTC (2:00 a.m. HST) at 19.8°N 150.1°W – Tropical Storm Gilma weakens into a tropical depression about 2,585 mi (4,160 km) west of the southern tip of the Baja California peninsula.

August 30

- 00:00 UTC (2:00 p.m. HST, August 29) at 20.7°N 152.2°W – Tropical Depression Gilma degenerates into a remnant low about 2,710 mi (4,365 km) west of the southern tip of the Baja California peninsula.
- 00:00 UTC (2:00 p.m. HST, August 29) at 21.4°N 173.0°W – Tropical Storm Hone weakens into a tropical depression about 865 mi (1,390 km) west of Kauaʻi.

August 31

- 15:00 UTC (5:00 a.m. HST) at 22.5°N 176.0°W – Tropical Depression Hone restrengthens into a tropical storm about 1,035 mi (1,670 km) west of Kauaʻi.

=== September ===
September 1

- 06:00 UTC (8:00 p.m. HST, August 31) at 23.8°N 176.5°W – Tropical Storm Hone transitions into a post-tropical cyclone about 1,090 mi (1,750 km) west of Kauaʻi, dissipating shortly thereafter.

September 12

- 12:00 UTC (5:00 a.m. MST) at 18.5°N 107.1°W – Tropical Depression Nine-E forms from an area of unsettled weather about 160 mi (260 km) southwest of Cabo Corrientes, Jalisco.
- 18:00 UTC (11:00 a.m. MST) at 19.5°N 107.7°W – Tropical Depression Nine-E strengthens into Tropical Storm Ileana about 145 mi (230 km) west-southwest of Cabo Corrientes.

September 14

- ~00:00 UTC (5:00 p.m. MST, September 13) near 23.1°N 109.3°W – Tropical Storm Ileana makes its closest approach to the Baja California peninsula, passing within 10 mi (20 km) of Cabo Pulmo National Park.
- 18:00 UTC (11:00 a.m. MST) at 25.2°N 108.9°W – Tropical Storm Ileana reaches maximum sustained winds of 50 mph (85 km/h) about 35 mi (55 km) south-southeast of Los Mochis, Sinaloa.

September 15

- 00:00 UTC (5:00 p.m. MST, September 14) at 25.4°N 109.0°W – Tropical Storm Ileana reaches a minimum barometric pressure of 997 mbar (29.44 inHg) about 15 mi (30 km) west of Topolobampo, Sinaloa.
- 06:00 UTC (11:00 p.m. MST, September 14) at 25.4°N 109.3°W – Tropical Storm Ileana weakens below gale force, degenerates into a remnant low about 25 mi (35 km) southwest of Topolobampo, and later dissipates.

September 22

- 12:00 UTC (6:00 a.m. CST) at 13.8°N 98.6°W – Tropical Depression Ten-E forms from a tropical wave about 230 mi (370 km) south-southeast of Acapulco.

September 23

- 00:00 UTC (6:00 p.m. CST, September 22) at 14.0°N 98.6°W – Tropical Depression Ten-E strengthens into Tropical Storm John about 215 mi (345 km) south-southeast of Acapulco.
- <18:00 UTC (12:00 p.m. CST) at 15.2°N 98.4°W – Tropical Storm John strengthens into a Category 1 hurricane about 150 mi (240 km) southeast of Acapulco.

September 24

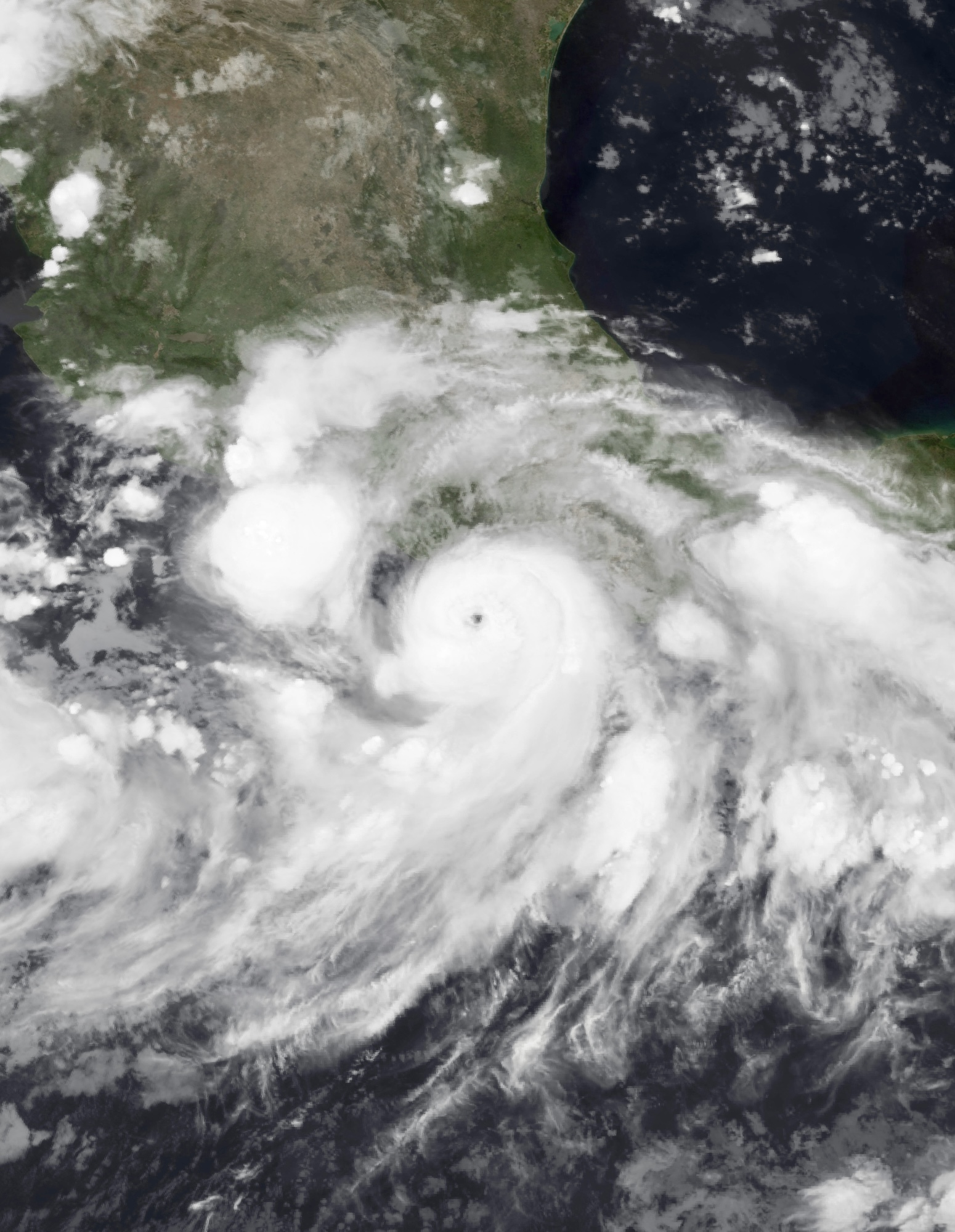
Hurricane John approaching the coast of Guerrero near peak intensity on September 24

- 00:00 UTC (6:00 p.m. CST, September 23) at 15.9°N 98.6°W – Hurricane John rapidly strengthens to Category 3 intensity about 50 mi (85 km) south-southeast of Marquelia, Guerrero, making it the second major hurricane of the season.
- 03:15 UTC (9:15 p.m. CST, September 23) at 16.6°N 98.9°W – Hurricane John reaches its peak intensity, with maximum sustained winds of 120 mph (195 km/h) and a minimum barometric pressure of 956 mbar (28.23 inHg), as it makes its first landfall near Marquelia.
- 06:00 UTC (12:00 a.m. CST) at 16.9°N 99.3°W – Hurricane John weakens to Category 2 intensity inland, about 40 mi (65 km) east of Acapulco.
- 12:00 UTC (6:00 a.m. CST) at 17.5°N 100.3°W – Hurricane John rapidly weakens into a tropical storm inland, about 50 mi (85 km) north-northwest of Acapulco.
- 18:00 UTC (12:00 p.m. CST) at 17.4°N 100.7°W – Tropical Storm John dissipates inland for the first time, about 65 mi (100 km) northwest of Acapulco.

September 25

- 12:00 UTC (6:00 a.m. CST) at 16.4°N 101.5°W – The remnants of Hurricane John regenerate into a tropical storm about 85 mi (140 km) south of Zihuatanejo, Guerrero.

September 26

- 12:00 UTC (6:00 a.m. CST) at 17.1°N 102.5°W – Tropical Storm John restrengthens into a Category 1 hurricane about 75 mi (120 km) west-southwest of Zihuatanejo. It simultaneously reaches its secondary peak intensity, with sustained winds of 75 mph (120 km/h) and a barometric pressure of 979 mbar (28.91 inHg).

September 27

- 00:00 UTC (6:00 p.m. CST, September 26) at 17.5°N 102.9°W – Hurricane John weakens back into a tropical storm about 90 mi (150 km) west of Zihuatanejo.
- 16:00 UTC (10:00 a.m. CST) at 18.2°N 103.1°W – Tropical Storm John makes its second and final landfall near Playa Zapote de Tizupan, Michoacán, with sustained winds of 60 mph (95 km/h) and a barometric pressure of 993 mbar (29.32 inHg).
- 18:00 UTC (12:00 p.m. CST) at 18.3°N 103.2°W – Tropical Storm John is last noted as a tropical cyclone inland, just northwest of Playa Zapote de Tizupan; it dissipates for the second and final time within the next six hours.

=== October ===
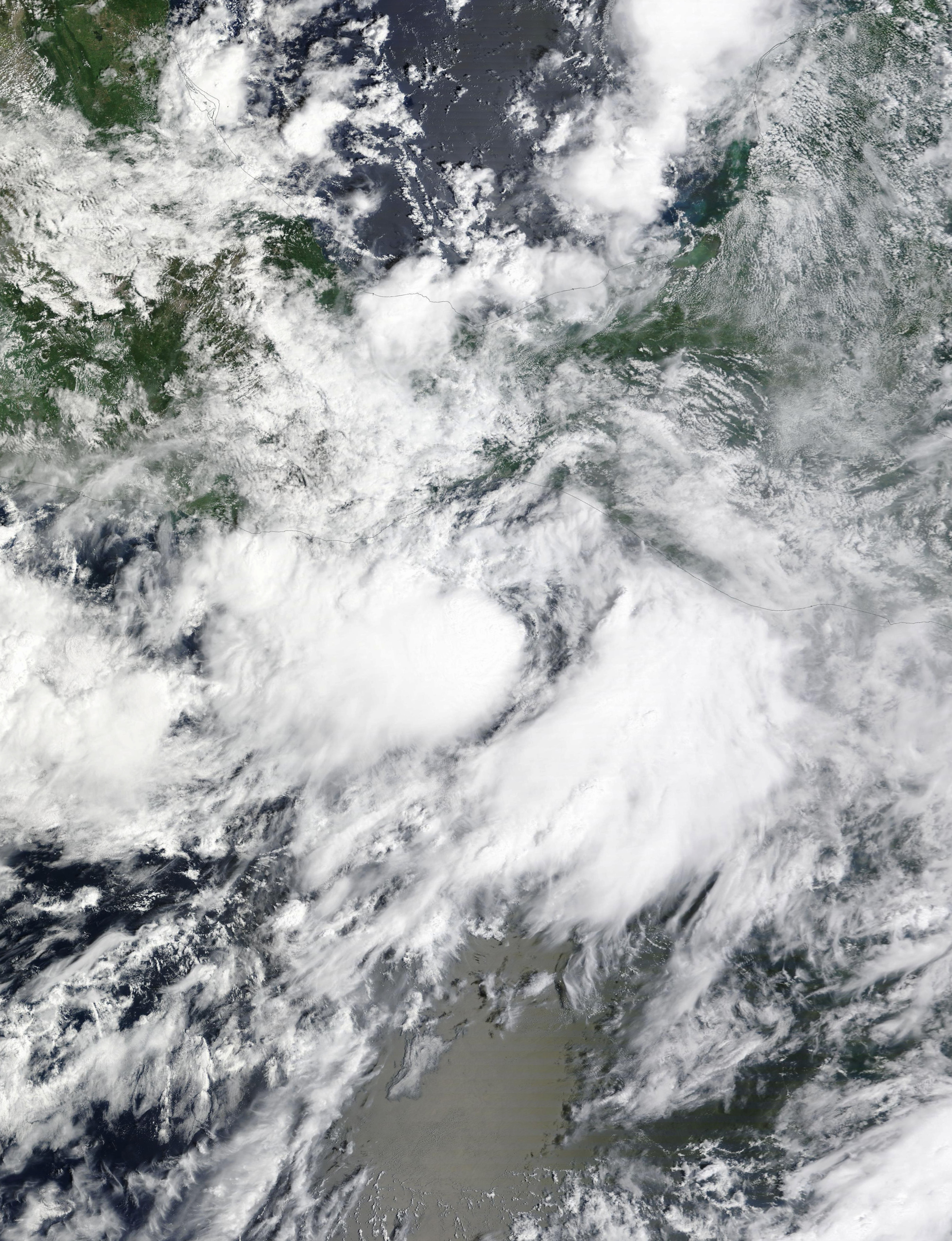
Tropical Depression Eleven-E off the coast of southeastern Mexico late on October 1

October 1

- 18:00 UTC (12:00 p.m. CST) at 14.9°N 94.6°W – The eleventh tropical depression of the season forms from a low-pressure area about 100 mi (155 km) south-southeast of Salina Cruz, Oaxaca.

October 2

- 06:00 UTC (12:00 a.m. CST) at 15.2°N 95.5°W – The eleventh tropical depression of the season strengthens into an unnamed tropical storm about 70 mi (110 km) south-southwest of Salina Cruz. (Note: Because the tropical storm was operationally assessed to have remained a tropical depression—designated Eleven-E—during its existence, it was not assigned a name.)

October 3

- 00:00 UTC (6:00 p.m. CST, October 2) at 14.4°N 96.1°W – The unnamed tropical storm reaches its peak intensity, with maximum sustained winds of 40 mph (65 km/h) and a minimum barometric pressure of 1001 mbar (29.56 inHg), about 140 mi (220 km) south-southwest of Salina Cruz.
- 12:00 UTC (6:00 a.m. CST) at 14.7°N 95.1°W – The unnamed tropical storm is last noted as a tropical cyclone about 105 mi (165 km) south of Salina Cruz; it dissipates within the next six hours.

October 21

- 12:00 UTC (6:00 a.m. CST) at 13.5°N 100.0°W – The twelfth tropical depression of the season forms from the remnants of Atlantic Tropical Storm Nadine about 230 mi (370 km) south of Acapulco.
- 18:00 UTC (12:00 p.m. CST) at 13.4°N 101.4°W – The twelfth tropical depression of the season strengthens into Tropical Storm Kristy about 260 mi (415 km) south-southwest of Acapulco.

October 23

- 00:00 UTC (5:00 p.m. MST, October 22) at 14.7°N 109.2°W – Tropical Storm Kristy strengthens into a Category 1 hurricane about 565 mi (905 km) south of the southern tip of the Baja California peninsula.
- 06:00 UTC (11:00 p.m. MST, October 22) at 14.5°N 111.1°W – Hurricane Kristy strengthens to Category 2 intensity about 580 mi (935 km) south of the southern tip of the Baja California peninsula.
- 12:00 UTC (8:00 a.m. MST) at 14.4°N 113.0°W – Hurricane Kristy strengthens to Category 3 intensity about 615 mi (990 km) south-southwest of the southern tip of the Baja California peninsula, making it the third and final major hurricane of the season.
- 18:00 UTC (1:00 p.m. MST) at 14.1°N 114.7°W – Hurricane Kristy strengthens to Category 4 intensity about 680 mi (1,095 km) south-southwest of the southern tip of the Baja California peninsula.

October 24

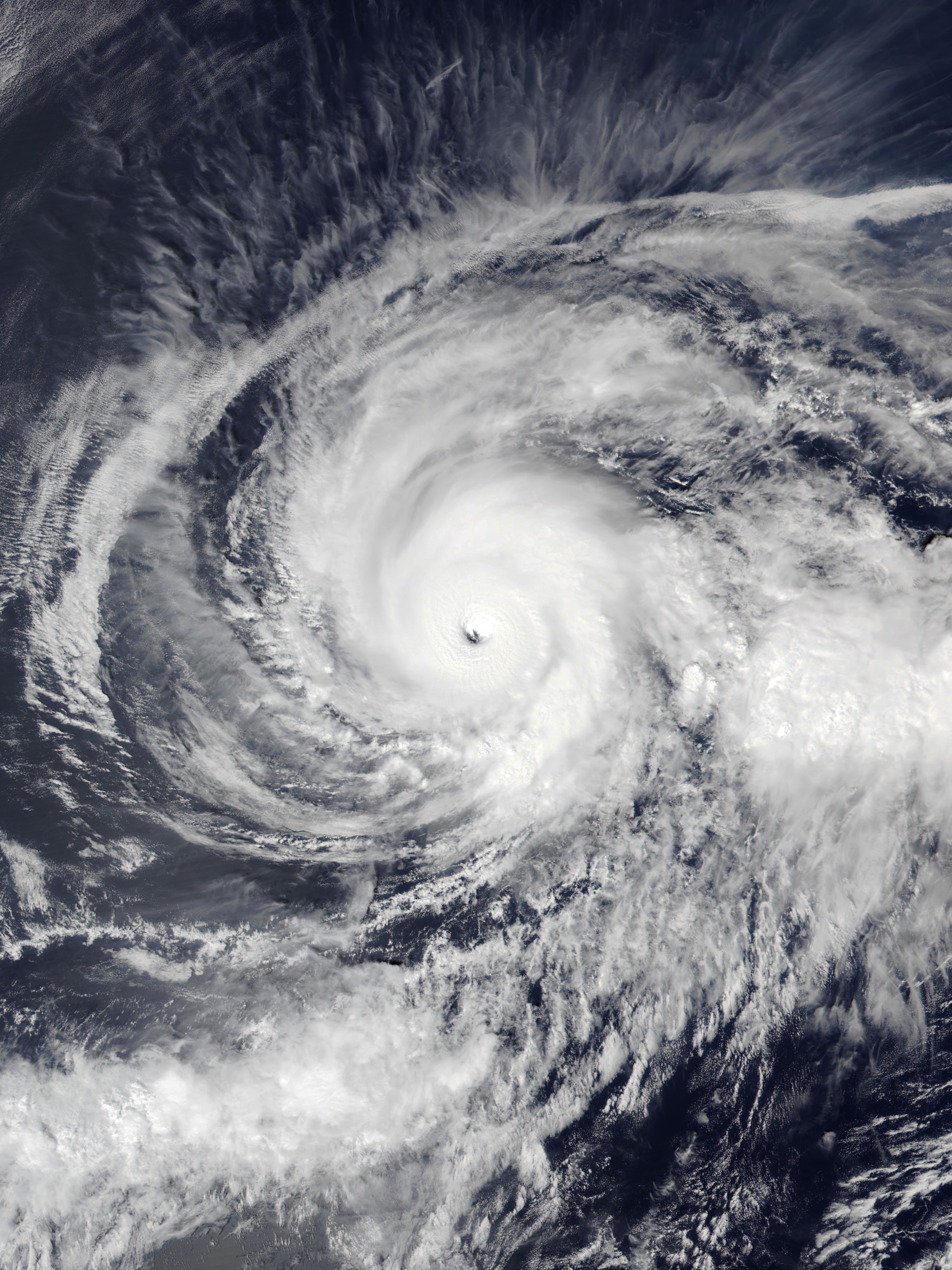
Hurricane Kristy at peak intensity on October 24

- 18:00 UTC (1:00 p.m. PDT) at 14.1°N 121.0°W – Hurricane Kristy strengthens to Category 5 intensity about 945 mi (1,520 km) west-southwest of the southern tip of the Baja California peninsula. It simultaneously reaches its peak intensity, with maximum sustained winds of 160 mph (260 km/h) and a minimum barometric pressure of 926 mbar (27.34 inHg), making it the strongest storm of the season.

October 25

- 06:00 UTC (11:00 p.m. PDT, October 24) at 14.9°N 123.4°W – Hurricane Kristy weakens to Category 4 intensity about 1,035 mi (1,665 km) west-southwest of the southern tip of the Baja California peninsula.
- 18:00 UTC (11:00 a.m. PDT) at 16.2°N 125.4°W – Hurricane Kristy weakens to Category 3 intensity about 1,105 mi (1,780 km) west-southwest of the southern tip of the Baja California peninsula.

October 26

- 00:00 UTC (5:00 p.m. PDT, October 25) at 17.1°N 126.4°W – Hurricane Kristy weakens to Category 2 intensity about 1,140 mi (1,835 km) west-southwest of the southern tip of the Baja California peninsula.
- 12:00 UTC (5:00 a.m. PDT) at 19.2°N 128.1°W – Hurricane Kristy weakens to Category 1 intensity about 1,195 mi (1,925 km) west of the southern tip of the Baja California peninsula.
- 18:00 UTC (11:00 a.m. PDT) at 20.2°N 128.9°W – Hurricane Kristy weakens into a tropical storm about 1,230 mi (1,980 km) west of the southern tip of the Baja California peninsula.

October 27

- 12:00 UTC (5:00 a.m. PDT) at 22.5°N 129.6°W – Tropical Storm Kristy transitions into a post-tropical cyclone about 1,250 mi (2,010 km) west of the southern tip of the Baja California peninsula.

=== November ===
November 1

- 12:00 UTC (5:00 a.m. PDT) at 11.1°N 127.6°W – Tropical Depression Thirteen-E forms from a tropical wave about 1,425 mi (2,295 km) southwest of the southern tip of the Baja California peninsula.

November 2

- 06:00 UTC (11:00 p.m. PDT, November 1) at 11.1°N 129.5°W – Tropical Depression Thirteen-E strengthens into Tropical Storm Lane about 1,510 mi (2,425 km) west-southwest of the southern tip of the Baja California peninsula.
- 12:00 UTC (5:00 a.m. PDT) at 11.2°N 139.7°W – Tropical Storm Lane reaches its peak intensity, with maximum sustained winds of 45 mph (75 km/h) and a minimum barometric pressure of 1004 mbar (29.65 inHg), about 1,530 mi (2,465 km) west-southwest of the southern tip of the Baja California peninsula.

November 3

- 06:00 UTC (11:00 p.m. PDT, November 2) at 11.2°N 130.9°W – Tropical Storm Lane weakens into a tropical depression about 1,600 mi (2,575 km) west-southwest of the southern tip of the Baja California peninsula.
- 12:00 UTC (4:00 a.m. PST) (Note: On November 3, daylight saving time ended in areas of the basin located within the Pacific Time Zone, resulting in the gap between local time and Coordinated Universal Time widening by one hour in those areas.) at 11.1°N 131.6°W – Tropical Depression Lane degenerates into a remnant low about 1,640 mi (2,640 km) west-southwest of the southern tip of the Baja California peninsula, and later dissipates.

November 5

- 00:00 UTC (5:00 p.m. MST, November 4) at 11.0°N 108.7°W – Tropical Depression Fourteen-E forms from an area of low pressure about 825 mi (1,325 km) south of the southern tip of the Baja California peninsula. It simulatenously reaches its peak intensity, with maximum sustained winds of 35 mph (55 km/h) and a minimum barometric pressure of 1006 mbar (29.71 inHg).

November 7

- 06:00 UTC (12:00 a.m. CST) at 13.3°N 104.9°W – Tropical Depression Fourteen-E is last noted as a tropical cyclone about 740 mi (1,195 km) south-southeast of the southern tip of the Baja California peninsula; it dissipates within the next six hours.

November 30

- The 2024 Pacific hurricane season officially ends.

== See also ==
- Timeline of the 2024 Atlantic hurricane season
- Tropical cyclones in 2024
- List of Pacific hurricanes
