= Fones (surname) =

Fones is a surname. Notable people with the surname include:

- Alfred Fones (1869–1938), American dentist
- Daniel Fones (b 1713), leading military commander
- Elizabeth Fones (1610–c. 1673), early American settler
- Thomas Fones (died 1638), English merchant and politician
- William Fones (1917–2010), American jurist

== See also ==
- Hones
- Jones (surname)
