= Hone =

Honing is a kind of metalworking.

Hone may also refer to:

- Hone (name) (incl. Hōne), a list of people with the surname, given name or nickname
- Hõne language, spoken in Gombe State and Taraba State, Nigeria
- Hône, Italy
- Hurricane Hone, affected Hawaii in 2024
