= Hurricane Hone =

Category 1 Pacific hurricane in 2024

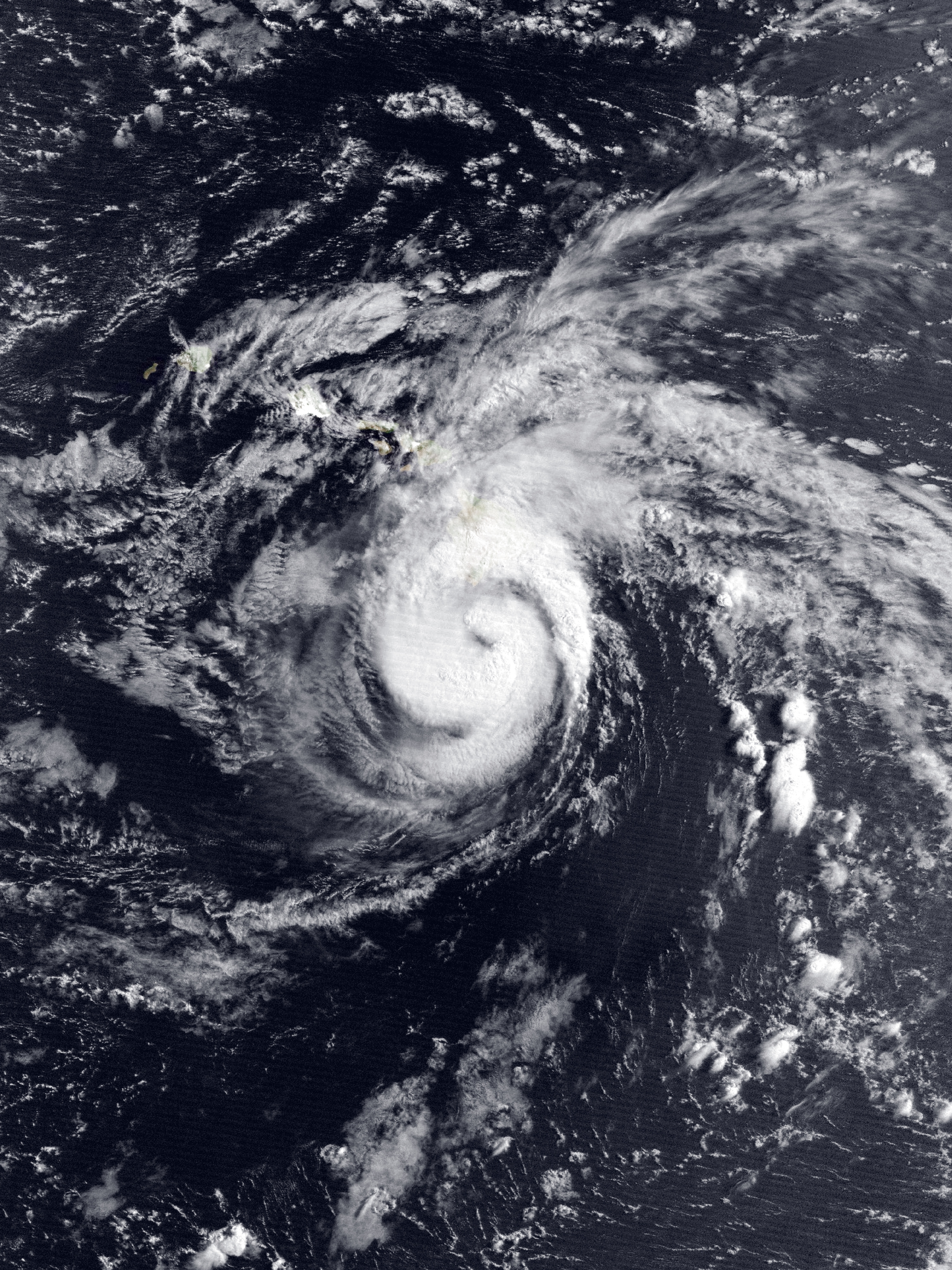
- Hurricane Hone south of the Big Island on August 25

Meteorological history
- Formed: August 22, 2024
- Dissipated: September 1, 2024

Category 1 hurricane
- 1-minute sustained (SSHWS/NWS)
- Highest winds: 85 mph (140 km/h)
- Lowest pressure: 988 mbar (hPa); 29.18 inHg

Overall effects
- Fatalities: None
- Damage: $8.05 million (2024 USD)
- Areas affected: Hawaii, Northwestern Hawaiian Islands
- Part of the 2024 Pacific hurricane season

Hurricane Hone (Note: The name Hone is a Hawaiian word meaning “sweet and soft”.) (/ˈhoʊneɪ/ HOH-neh) was a fairly long-lived tropical cyclone that impacted the U.S. state of Hawaii in August 2024. The eighth named storm and third hurricane of the 2024 Pacific hurricane season, Hone was also the first tropical cyclone to form in the North Central Pacific tropical cyclone basin since 2019. Hone developed from two disturbances that formed over the northeastern Pacific Ocean in late August 2024. The two disturbances eventually merged into a larger area of disturbed weather on August 20. (Note: All dates and times are in Coordinated Universal Time, unless otherwise noted.) The merged system steadily became more organized, and the development of persistent deep convection over its center led to its designation as Tropical Depression One-C on August 22. The depression strengthened into a tropical storm six hours later. Hone gradually strengthened as it approached Hawaii from the southeast. On August 25, Hone strengthened into a hurricane while located just south of Hawaii's Big Island. After passing near the islands with maximum sustained winds of 85 mph (140 km/h), Hone began to weaken as it continued westward away from Hawaii and was absorbed by a low pressure area near the International Date Line on September 1.

Prior to its designation as a tropical depression, the National Hurricane Center and Central Pacific Hurricane Center warned of Hone's potential to bring heavy rainfall and dangerous rip currents to the Hawaiian Islands. The Hawaii County Civil Defense was activated ahead of the storm's anticipated passage. A tropical storm warning was issued for the Big Island, while various flood and wildfire warnings were issued for other parts of the island chain. Hone dropped very heavy rainfall across the island, with some areas seeing 18 inches (460 millimeters) or more fall during the storm's passage just 50 nautical miles south of South Point. Strong waves of up to eighteen feet in height and rip currents buffeted the coast of the island. Overall, Hone resulted in $8.05 million (Note: All damage totals are in 2024 United States dollars) in property and crop damage across Hawaii, primarily on the Big Island.

== Meteorological history ==
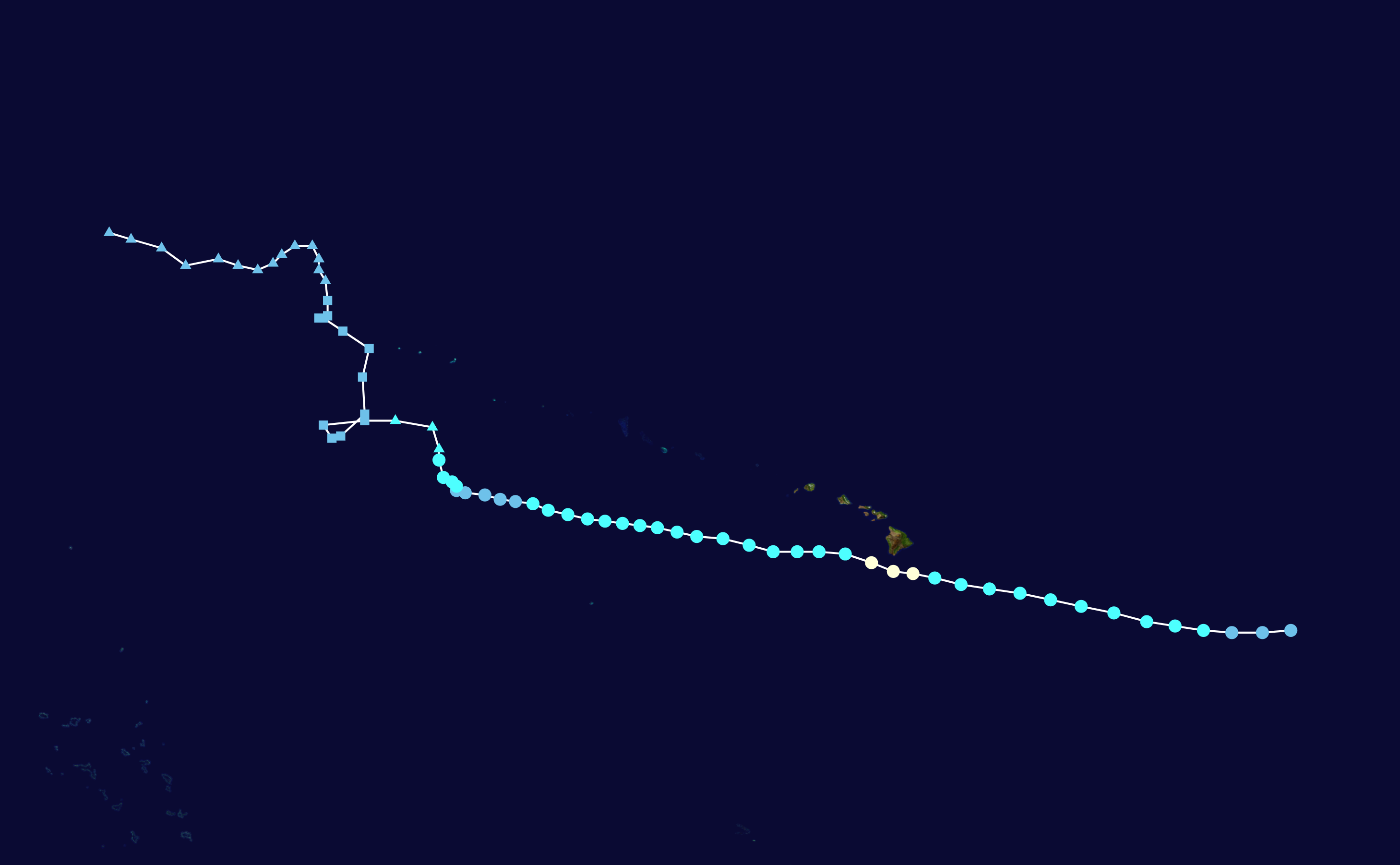
Map plotting the storm's track and intensity, according to the Saffir–Simpson scale Map key Saffir–Simpson scale Tropical depression (≤38 mph, ≤62 km/h) Tropical storm (39–73 mph, 63–118 km/h) Category 1 (74–95 mph, 119–153 km/h) Category 2 (96–110 mph, 154–177 km/h) Category 3 (111–129 mph, 178–208 km/h) Category 4 (130–156 mph, 209–251 km/h) Category 5 (≥157 mph, ≥252 km/h) Unknown Storm type Tropical cyclone Subtropical cyclone Extratropical cyclone, remnant low, tropical disturbance, or monsoon depression

The origin of Hone can be traced back to a disturbance that formed within a broad and convectively active monsoon trough around 1,725 mi (2,780 km) to the east-southeast of the Hawaiian Islands over the western portion of the eastern Pacific Ocean on August 18. Showers and thunderstorms associated with the disturbance gradually organized during the next several days, while the system moved slowly westward, and the disturbance was given the designation EP91. The disturbance that Hone would eventually develop from was also interacting with another disturbance, EP90, to its southwest. The dominant disturbance to the east, developed a well-defined circulation and sufficient convection to be designated a tropical depression by August 22, when it was located about 1,150 mi (1,850 km) east-southeast of the Hawaiian Islands. The depression crossed into the Central Pacific basin later that day, and it strengthened into Tropical Storm Hone that evening. Hone moved steadily west-northwestward across the Central Pacific during the next several days along a large subtropical ridge to the north. The storm gradually strengthened on its approach to the Hawaiian Islands, fighting off dry air, while otherwise in a favorable environment with low wind shear and warm sea surface temperatures. By 06:00 UTC on August 25, while located about 115 mi (185 km) south of Hilo on the Big Island of Hawaii, Hone had reached hurricane strength, with maximum sustained winds estimated to be 75 mph (120 km/h). Hone strengthened further while making its closest approach to the Hawaiian Islands, reaching a peak intensity of 85 mph (140 km/h) 6 hours later. At that time, Hone was 50 mi (85 km) south of South Point on the Big Island. Hone moved steadily westward, to the south of the Hawaiian Island chain for the next couple of days, steered along a ridge to the north of Hawaii. The cyclone weakened into a tropical storm around 00:00 UTC on August 26, as increasing wind shear and drier air weakened Hone. Hone maintained tropical storm strength for the next several days while it continued to track westward, with the cyclone gradually weakening due to persistent vertical wind shear, causing deep convection to become increasingly intermittent. Hone weakened into a tropical depression at 00:00 UTC on August 30 over the western portion of the Central Pacific basin, around 865 mi (1,390 km) west of Kauai.

The next day, wind shear decreased and sea surface temperatures warmed caused by a low-pressure area, causing convection to increase in Hone. Hone regained tropical storm status by later that day as it slowed down and turned toward the north, steered between the low to the northwest and a subtropical ridge to the east. However, convection waned, and Hone degenerated to a post-tropical low on September 1 was absorbed into a low-pressure area.

== Preparations ==
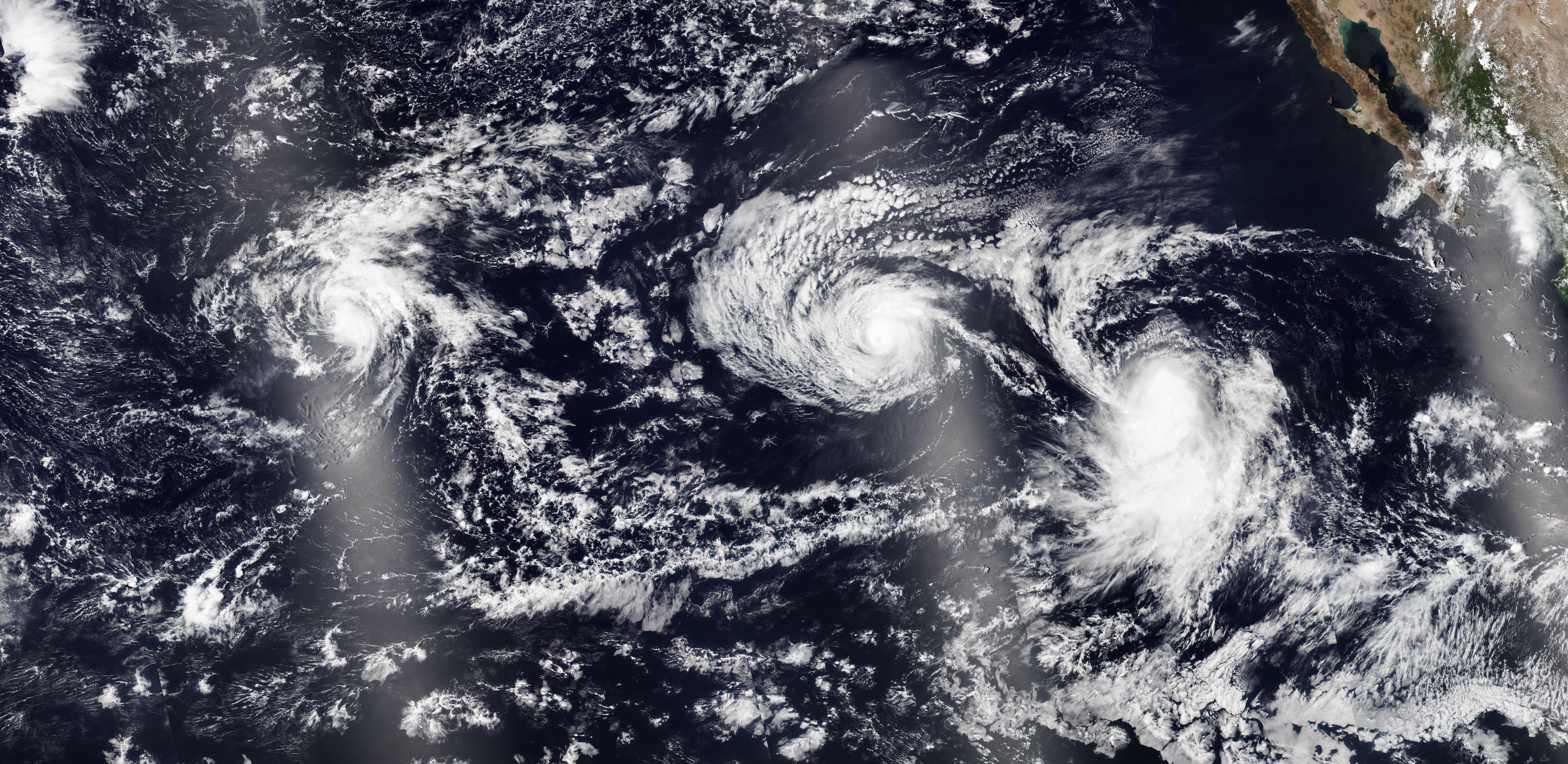
Hone (left), alongside Hurricane Gilma (center), and Tropical Storm Hector (right), on August 26

Both the National Hurricane Center (NHC) and Central Pacific Hurricane Center (CPHC) warned of Hone's potential to bring heavy rainfall and strong winds and waves to portions of the main Hawaiian Islands while the system was still developing. Stronger winds from Hone presented the threat of spreading wildfires across the Big Island and Maui, a year after the devastating 2023 Hawaii wildfires which were partially influenced by Hurricane Dora. Hawaii County Civil Defense was activated on August 22, while the county's Department of Public Works assessed infrastructure on the big island ahead of Hone's expected passage to the south. The 2024 International Va’a Federation finals, an international competition in the sport of outrigger canoeing (va’a), was scheduled to end early due to the weather threats. A tropical storm watch and flood watch were both issued for the Big Island shortly after Hone's formation, while a tropical storm warning was put in place for offshore waters surrounding the entire state. The tropical storm watch was upgraded to a warning for the Big Island at 3:00 UTC on August 24. A red flag alert, indicating conditions were very favorable for a wildfire, was issued for 10AM to 6PM HST on August 24 due to Hone's strong winds pushing dry air north of the storm over parts of the island chain. Wind advisories were also issued for the islands of Maui, Oahu and Kauai. Flood mitigation equipment, such as culverts, were prepared for the coming storm by emergency management officials in Maui.

On August 24, Hawaii Governor Josh Green issued an emergency proclamation for the state. Hawaiian Airlines issued a travel waiver for those with flights to Hilo or Kona on August 24 and 25. Various high school sport and youth outdoors events were cancelled by the Hawaii High School Athletic Association and Department of Land and Natural Resources, respectively. Despite this, the Hawaii Tourism Authority informed travelers that it was still safe to come to the island during Hone's passage, but to avoid outdoor activities. All of Hawaii's campgrounds were closed through August 26 due to the storm, as well as Punaluʻu Beach and Whittington Beach parks. Hawaiʻi Volcanoes National Park's coastal backcountry and Mauna Loa was closed due to tropical storm conditions. As rounds of rain from Hone began to impact the Big Island, flash flood watches were issued there as well. While Hone moved erratically northwest of Hawaii, a tropical storm watch was issued for Kure Atoll, Midway Atoll and part of the Papahanaumokuakea Marine National Monument. The watches were eventually discontinued when Hone was designated an extratropical cyclone by the CPHC.

== Impact ==
Wettest tropical cyclones and their remnants in Hawaii Highest-known totals
| Precipitation | | | Storm | Location | Ref. |
| Rank | mm | in | Storm | Location | Ref. |
|---|---|---|---|---|---|
| 1 | 1473 | 58.00 | Lane 2018 | Kahūnā Falls, Hawaii | |
| 2 | 1321 | 52.00 | Hiki 1950 | Kanalohuluhulu Ranger Station | |
| 3 | 1106 | 43.54 | Lala 2026 | Laupāhoehoe | |
| 4 | 985 | 38.76 | Paul 2000 | Kapapala Ranch 36 | |
| 5 | 732 | 28.82 | Hone 2024 | Volcano Island | |
| 6 | 635 | 25.00 | Maggie 1970 | Various stations | |
| 7 | 519 | 20.42 | Nina 1957 | Wainiha | |
| 8 | 516 | 20.33 | Iwa 1982 | Intake Wainiha 1086 | |
| 9 | 476 | 18.75 | Fabio 1988 | Papaikou Mauka 140.1 | |
| 10 | 387 | 15.25 | Iselle 2014 | Kulani NWR | |

Rainfall totals reached 10 in (250 mm) to 15 in (380 mm) inches across the Big Island, with more local flooding of 18 in (460 mm) or higher. The highest rainfall occurred in Volcano Island, where more than 28.82 in (732 mm) fell, while the USGS Saddle Quarry station recorded 25.03 in (636 mm). The rainfall, however, was beneficial in some areas as it alleviated fears of wildfires and allowed red flag warnings to be discontinued. Only a small wildfire occurred on the night of August 23 in Waikoloa on the Big Island, located within the drier side of the island. Strong winds also impacted the Big Island, with a maximum wind gust of 72 mph (116 km/h) recorded at Kohala Ranch.

Life-threatening surf and rip currents impacted Hawaii as well due to Hone. The hurricane generated waves of fourteen to eighteen feet along the eastern shores of the Big Island and Maui. Flooding caused the closure of several roads on the Big Island, including Hawaiian Highway 11. At least 7,200 people lost power within the first few hours of Hone's passage. That number rose to 11,099 by midnight local time on August 25. A total of almost 26,000 people lost electricity due to Hone, the majority of them on the Big Island. However, power was restored to all but 2,000 by the next day. Strong winds and large waves lashed the island as Hone approached. The intense weather from Hone caused several flight cancellations at Hilo International Airport. A large tree fell and blocked all traffic on the Mauna Kea access road. In Maui, strong winds tore the roof off a house. A mudslide also covered part of the Hana Highway near Upper Waikani Falls. Power outages occurred on the islands of Maui and Oahu. A boat ran aground on the western shore of Kauai amidst the storm.

Hawaii County received thirty-eight damage reports, including nine major damage reports, indicating several properties were rendered uninhabitable. A total of $5 million in property damage and $10,000 in crop damage was reported. Hone resulted in $3 million in damage to several roads across the Kau and Puna districts of the Big Island. Downed power lines and utilities also caused several tens of thousands of dollars in damage across multiple Big Island districts and in Honolulu on Oahu. Overall, Hone resulted in $8.04 million in property damage in Hawaii and $10,000 in crop damage.

== See also ==
- Weather of 2024
- Tropical cyclones in 2024
- List of Category 1 Pacific hurricanes
- List of Hawaii hurricanes
- Timeline of the 2024 Pacific hurricane season
