= Fones House =

Historic house in Arkansas, United States

- U.S. National Register of Historic Places
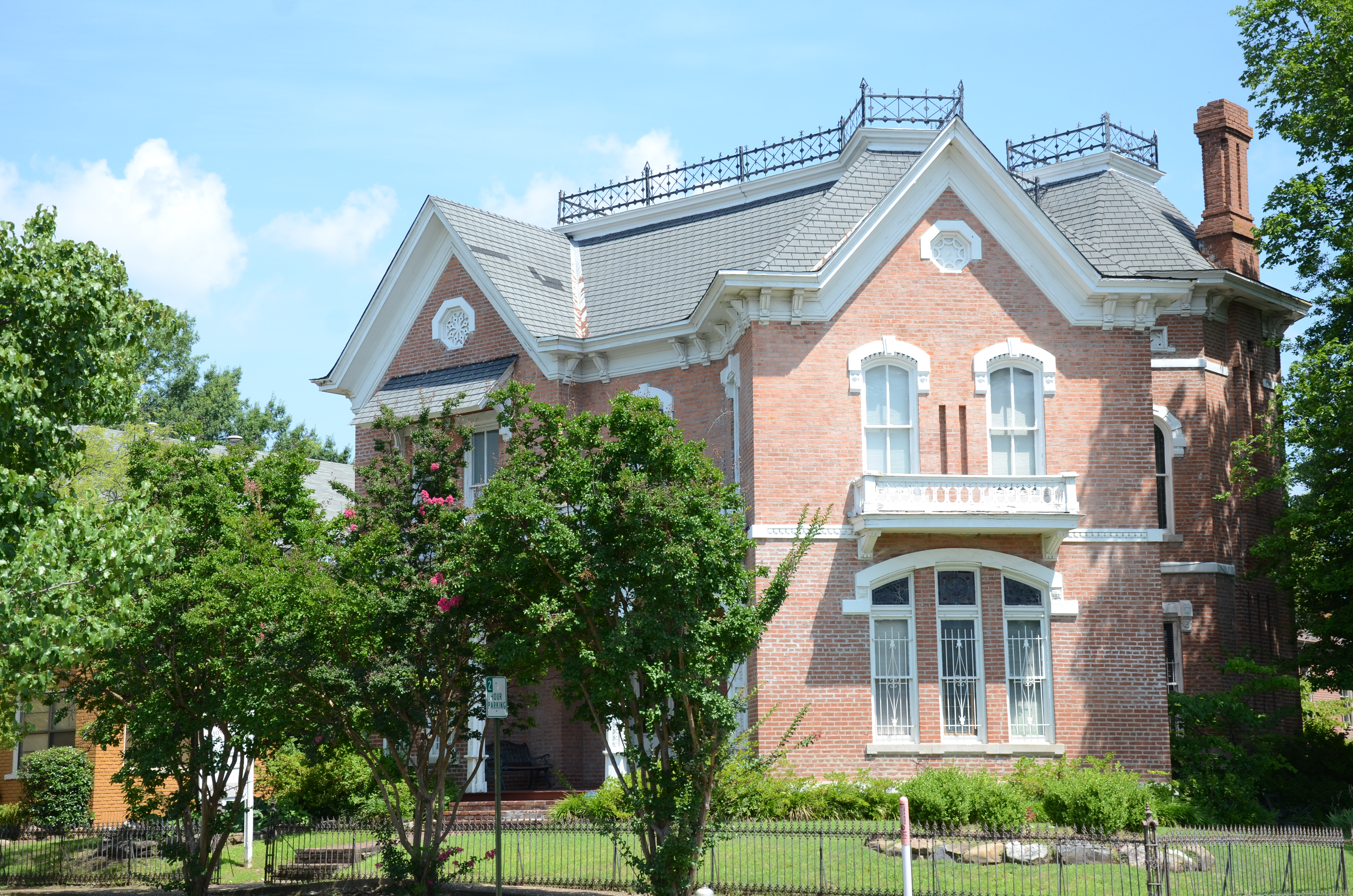

- Location within Arkansas Location within the United States
- Location: 902 W. 2nd St., Little Rock, Arkansas
- Coordinates: 34°44′55″N 92°16′48″W
- Area: less than one acre
- Built: 1878
- Architectural style: Italianate
- NRHP reference No.: 75000406
- Added to NRHP: August 19, 1975

The Fones House is a historic house at 902 West 2nd Street in Little Rock, Arkansas. It is a 2 1/2-story brick building, topped by a steeply pitched gable roof with iron cresting at the top. Windows are set in round-arch or segmented-arch openings, with decorative hoods. The front facade has a single-story porch extending across it, supported by bracketed posts, and has a balcony with a decorative railing. The house was built in 1878 by Daniel G. Fones, a veteran of the American Civil War and a prominent local hardware dealer.

The house was listed on the National Register of Historic Places in 1975.

== See also ==
- National Register of Historic Places listings in Little Rock, Arkansas
