= HearFones =

HearFones is an acoustic, non-electronic instrument that enables a person speaking or singing to hear the actual sound they are producing. The device is used by professional singers and has also been used in therapy for those with auditory issues.

== Description ==
HearFones is a patented instrument that enables a person speaking or singing to hear the actual sound of the voice they are producing. HearFones fit over the head and redirect sound binaurally from the mouth to the ears using ellipsoidal reflectors, one focus of which is at the user's mouth and the other focus at the ear canals.

HearFones

While similar in concept to traditional "hand cupping," this more accurate representation of the user's voice effects an immediate change in the way the user speaks or sings, as they intuitively modify their vocal habits to create a voice that they prefer HearFones are used by amateur and professional singers, vocal coaches speech-language pathologist patients and new-language learners to build new, or to modify existing, muscle-memory patterns and to modify breathing patterns The device has also been used to teach a child with learning disabilities and auditory processing issues how to blend in with their school singing group. Peer-reviewed research on the effects of HearFones shows that HearFones users make immediate and unprompted changes in their voice that are regarded as an improvement by skilled evaluators and that reflect more efficient vocal use.
