= Alexander Hones =

Austrian association football player

Personal information
- Full name: Alexander Hones
- Date of birth: 14 November 1999 (age 26)
- Place of birth: Wolfern, Austria
- Height: 1.77 m (5 ft 10 in)
- Position: Left-back

Youth career
- 2007–2009: Union Wolfern
- 2009–2015: Union St. Florian
- 2015–2016: Vorwärts Steyr

Senior career*
Years	Team	Apps	(Gls)
2016–2022	Vorwärts Steyr II		
2019–2022	Vorwärts Steyr	2	(0)
- * Club domestic league appearances and goals as of 14:24, 21 March 2021 (UTC)

Alexander Hones (born 14 November 1999) is an Austrian footballer who plays as a left-back.

== Career ==
=== Club career ===
Born in Wolfern, Hones began his career at Union Wolfern, before joining Union St. Florian in 2009 in later SK Vorwärts Steyr in April 2015. Hones got began playing for the clubs senior reserve team in 2016.

On 21 April 2019, Hones got his professional debut for Vorwärts Steyr's first team in the Austrian 2. Liga against WSG Swarovski Tirol, playing the whole game. He made one further league appearance in the following month and was on the bench for six games in that season.
