= Hurricane Darby (2016) =

Category 3 Pacific hurricane in 2016

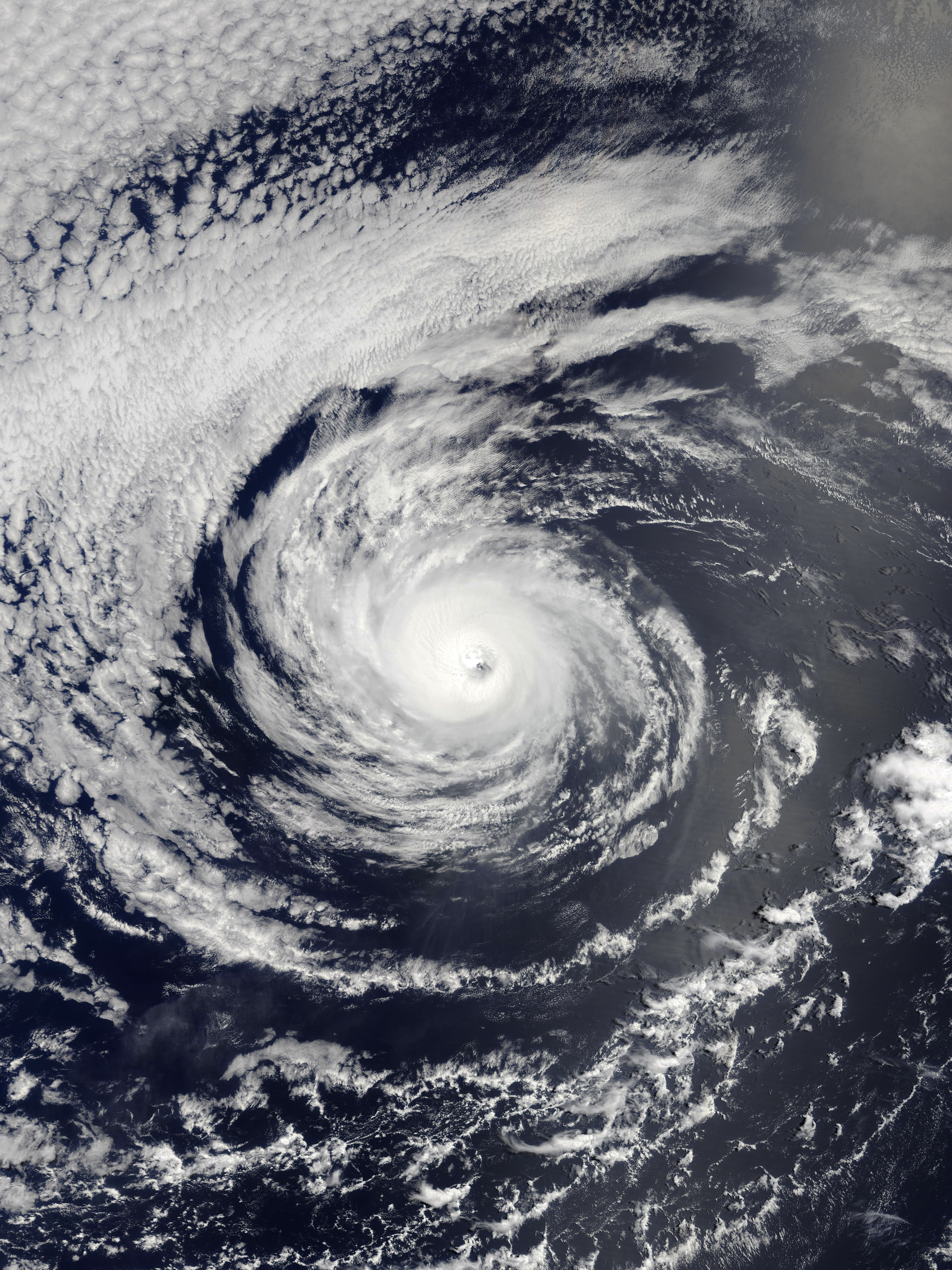
- Darby at peak intensity on July 16

Meteorological history
- Formed: July 11, 2016
- Dissipated: July 26, 2016

Category 3 major hurricane
- 1-minute sustained (SSHWS/NWS)
- Highest winds: 120 mph (195 km/h)
- Lowest pressure: 958 mbar (hPa); 28.29 inHg

Overall effects
- Fatalities: None
- Damage: Minimal
- Areas affected: Hawaii
- IBTrACS /
- Part of the 2016 Pacific hurricane season

Hurricane Darby was a strong tropical cyclone which affected Hawaii as a tropical storm. The fifth named storm of the busy 2016 Pacific hurricane season, Darby originated from a low pressure area that developed in the Eastern Pacific well southwest of Mexico during July 2016. It gained sufficient organization to be declared a tropical depression on July 11, and was upgraded to Tropical Storm Darby the next day. Further intensification ensued, and Darby became a hurricane on July 13. Over the next three days, Darby slowly strengthened to Category 3 status on the Saffir–Simpson scale, becoming a major hurricane. Cool waters and dry air caused Darby to weaken over the next three days, although Darby managed to restrengthen slightly on July 21 before weakening once again as the storm neared Hawaii. Just after midnight on July 24 (UTC; 2:00 p.m. on July 23 HST), Darby made landfall on the Big Island. Darby weakened into a remnant low two days later.

Darby was the second tropical storm to make landfall in Hawaii in two years. Before landfall, tropical storm watches and warnings were issued for all of Hawaii, and were only discontinued after Darby weakened to a tropical depression on July 25. Over the period of July 23 to July 25, Darby brought heavy rain and widespread flash floods to the windward sides of the Hawaiian Islands, with storm rainfall totals exceeding 5 in (130 mm) on the Big Island and 7 in (180 mm) in Oahu. This resulted in some road closures, sewage spills, numerous flight cancellations, and minor property damage. Overall, no fatalities occurred during the passage of Darby.

== Meteorological history ==
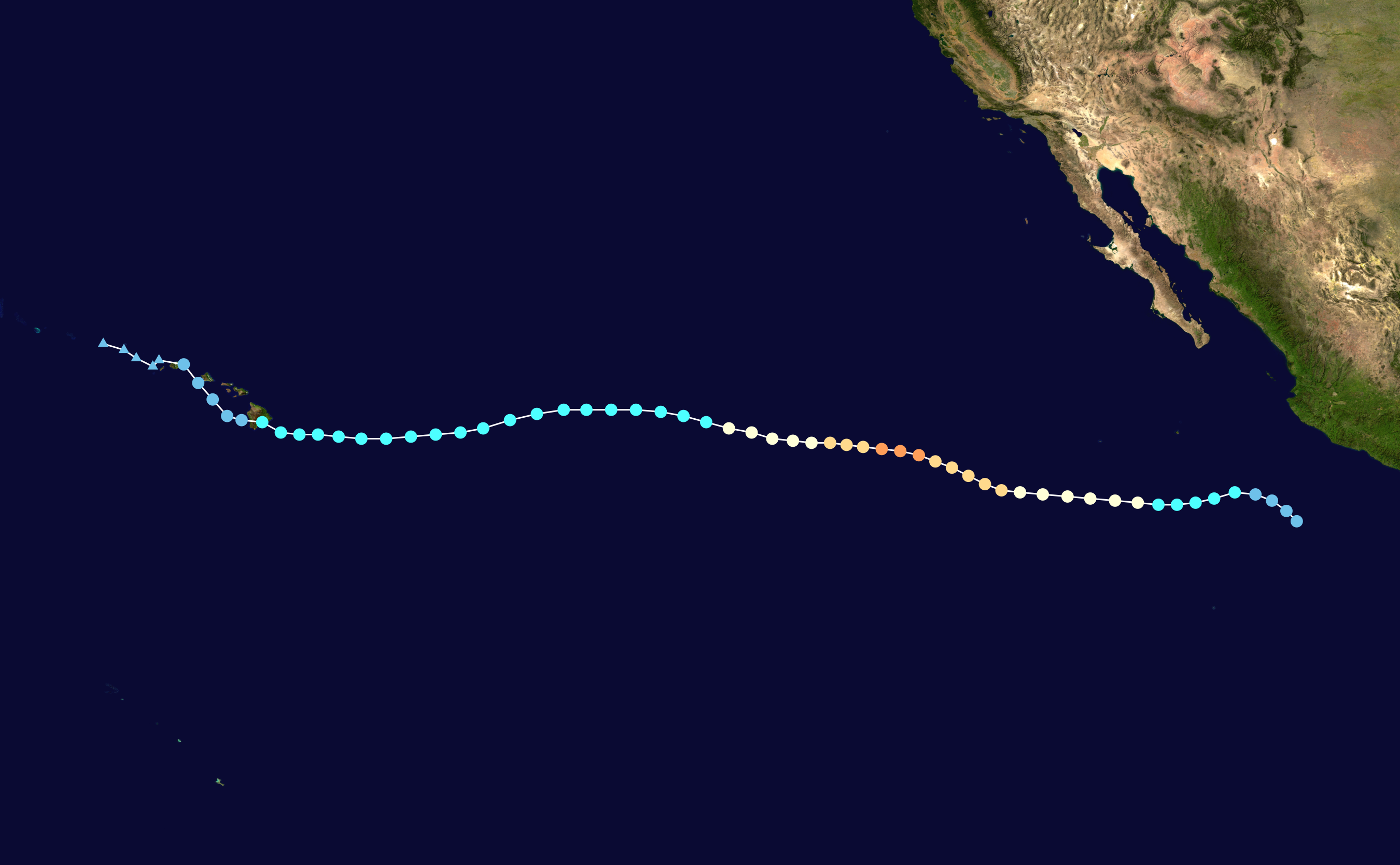
Map plotting the storm's track and intensity, according to the Saffir–Simpson scale Map key Saffir–Simpson scale Tropical depression (≤38 mph, ≤62 km/h) Tropical storm (39–73 mph, 63–118 km/h) Category 1 (74–95 mph, 119–153 km/h) Category 2 (96–110 mph, 154–177 km/h) Category 3 (111–129 mph, 178–208 km/h) Category 4 (130–156 mph, 209–251 km/h) Category 5 (≥157 mph, ≥252 km/h) Unknown Storm type Tropical cyclone Subtropical cyclone Extratropical cyclone, remnant low, tropical disturbance, or monsoon depression

In the first two weeks of July, a series of low pressure areas formed off the coast of Mexico. The fourth of these was spawned by a tropical wave several hundred miles south-southeast of Acapulco, Mexico, first noted by the National Hurricane Center (NHC) on July 9. Amid favorable conditions, convection associated with the low developed and increased in organization, and a tropical depression formed on the afternoon of July 11 centered 290 mi (470 km) south-southwest of Manzanillo, Mexico. Despite moving over sea surface temperatures of at least 82 °F (28 °C), moderate northeasterly wind shear hindered development; however, the depression soon obtained sufficient organization to be upgraded to a tropical storm and given the name Darby. On July 13, the shear decreased, and as a result Darby began to intensify quickly, strengthening into a hurricane 30 hours after becoming a tropical storm. At that time, Darby was located about 570 miles (920 km) south-southwest of the southern tip of the Baja California Peninsula.

Tracking steadily west-northwestward along the southern periphery of a subtropical ridge, Darby continued to intensify albeit at a slower rate due to its proximity to dry air. On July 15, Darby became a Category 2 hurricane on the Saffir–Simpson hurricane wind scale. Despite decreasing ocean temperatures, Darby intensified further to attain winds of 105 mph (169 km/h). Strengthening was no longer expected as Darby moved over sea temperatures of less than 79 °F (26 °C), but on July 16, Darby managed to develop an annular structure. Convection became more symmetric, outer rainbands dissipated, and the 25 mile-wide (35 km) eye became increasingly well defined. Darby reached its peak intensity as a Category 3 hurricane with winds of 120 mph (190 km/h) and a minimum pressure of 958 mbar (958 hPa; 28.3 inHg). However, twelve hours later, Darby weakened back to a Category 2 hurricane as convection deteriorated. Embedded in cool sinking air and moving over decreasing sea surface temperatures, Darby began a gradual weakening trend, degrading to a Category 1 hurricane by July 18. Despite warming cloud tops, Darby exhibited a well-defined circulation and a ragged eye feature, remaining a minimal hurricane through the rest of the day. However, Darby finally weakened to a tropical storm on July 19. Darby continued to degrade as it crossed 140°W into the Central Pacific, and entered the jurisdiction of the Central Pacific Hurricane Center (CPHC) on July 20 with winds of 60 mph (97 km/h).

Soon after, Darby turned west-southwestwards as it continued to weaken, but the shear diminished slightly on July 21, allowing Darby to restrengthen to winds of 65 mph (105 km/h). The reprieve was short-lived, however, as an approaching upper-level low once again increased shear over the system the next day. Darby began to curve back to the west on July 23 as it approached a weakness in the aforementioned subtropical ridge, all the while weakening slowly. Just after 00:00 UTC on July 24 (2:00 p.m. HST on July 23), Darby made landfall on the Big Island near the village of Pahala in the Kaʻū District, with winds of 40 mph (64 km/h). This marked one of only six occurrences of a tropical cyclone of tropical storm intensity or higher making landfall on one of the major islands in the state of Hawaii since record keeping began in 1949. The others were an unnamed tropical storm in 1958, Hurricane Dot in 1959, Hurricane Iniki in 1992, Tropical Storm Iselle in 2014, and Tropical Storm Olivia in 2018. After crossing the Big Island, Darby began to accelerate northwestwards in earnest while maintaining as a minimal tropical storm. On July 25, Darby weakened into a depression, and degenerated into a remnant low on the next day 265 mi (426 km) west-northwest of Honolulu.

== Preparations and impact ==
Infrared satellite loop of Darby making landfall in the Big Island on July 23

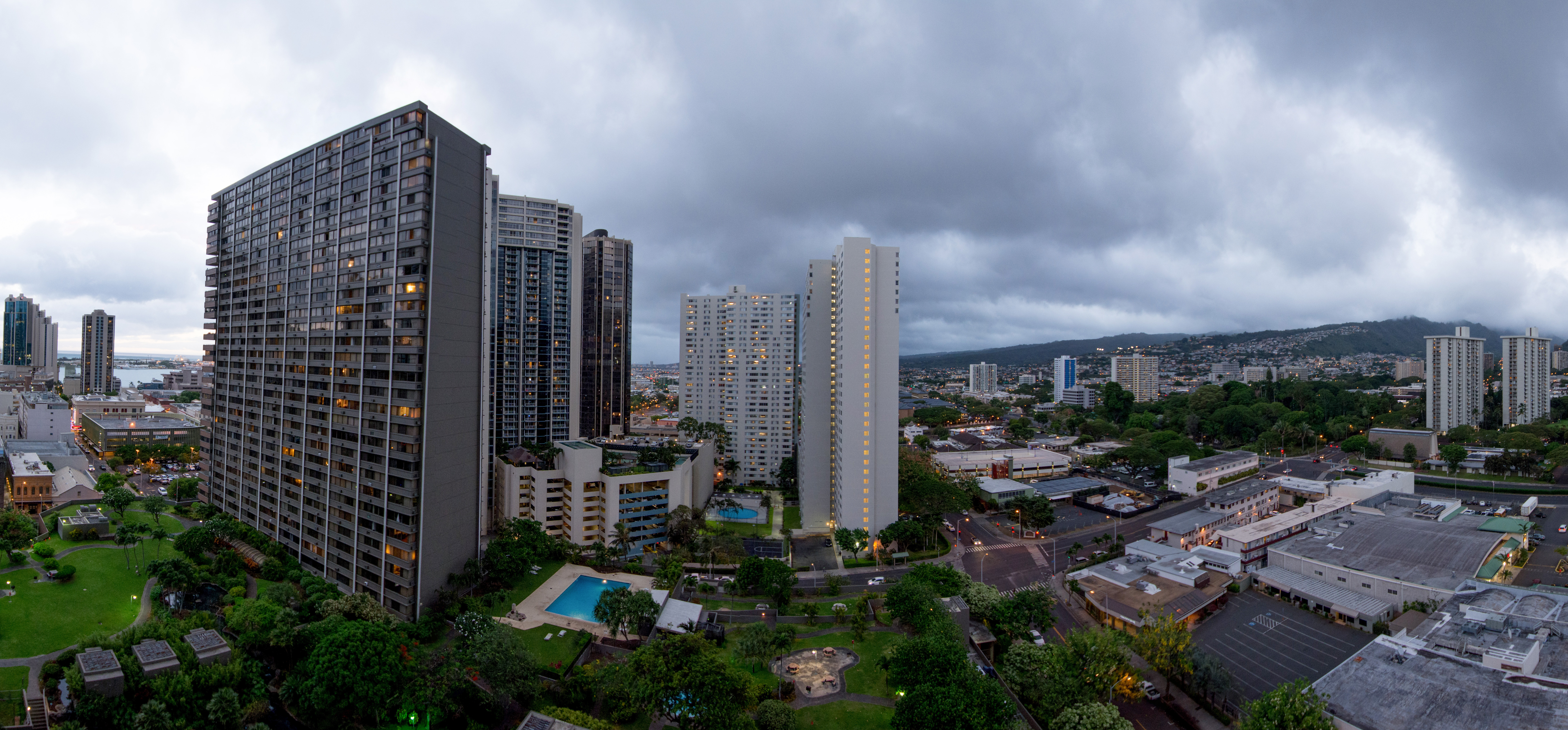
Storm clouds ahead of Darby in Honolulu

As Darby approached Hawaii on July 21, a tropical storm watch was issued for Hawaii County and Maui County. These were modified to tropical storm warnings by noon the next day. A tropical storm watch was issued for Oahu late on July 22 as Darby continued to move closer to Hawaii, and was modified to a tropical storm warning the next morning. Eventually, after Darby made landfall in Kaʻū District in the afternoon of July 23, the tropical storm warning was extended to all islands in the state of Hawaii. The watches and warnings were gradually discontinued as Darby weakened and moved away from the islands, with none remaining by July 25.

In advance of the storm, Governor of Hawaii David Ige declared a state of emergency, calling for people to "follow emergency instructions, prepare for the storm and take steps to protect your families, employees and property". Flights to and from the region were delayed or cancelled; Island Air, American Airlines, Delta Air Lines, Hawaiian Airlines, and United Airlines waived change fees for affected customers. The Oahu Hawaiian Canoe Racing Association cancelled its championship due to be held on July 24. Both the Hawaii and Maui campuses of the Kamehameha Schools were closed over the weekend, and athletic events due to be held there were cancelled or postponed. In Hawaii County and Oahu, all state parks and campgrounds were closed until July 25; Maui and Kauai counties suffered partial closures instead.

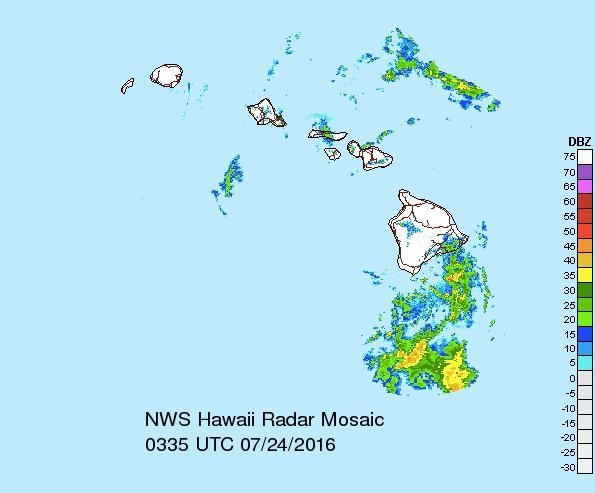
Radar image of Darby a few hours after landfall on July 24

Despite not being hit by a named storm in decades, the Big Island was directly hit twice in a three-year period with Tropical Storm Iselle making landfall 23 months prior to Darby, doing so in almost the exact location. Heavy rainfall occurred along the windward slopes within the range of 5 to 8 in (130 to 200 mm), peaking at 7.41 in (188 mm) near the Kawai Nui Marsh. Flash flooding occurred in the South Kohala, Kau, and Hamakua districts which forced the closure of numerous roads. However, Hilo, located between these heavily impacted districts, recorded a relatively modest 1.77 inches of rain on July 23 and 24. After passing over the Big Island, Darby proceeded northwestward via the Kauaʻi Channel, while resulting in heavy rains over southern slope of Haleakala on Maui. These rains forced the closure of Highway 11, as well as parts of Interstate H-1 and the Kamehameha Highway. Island-wide, a peak 24-hour rainfall total, 8.51 in (215 mm), was measured in Wailuaiki. In Oahu, rainfall, sometimes at rates of 3 to 4 in (75 to 100 mm) per hour, caused flash flooding in several areas within the urban core of Honolulu and along windward slopes. A stream in Kalihi inundated several properties and spilled over a bridge located further downstream. Several sewage spills occurred on Oahu due to the heavy rain, including 42,000 gallons (160,000 litres) at the Kailua Wastewater Treatment Plant and 4,100 gallons (15,500 litres) from a private residence on Liliha Street. This resulted in the issuance of a brown water advisory. In all, peak storm totals on Oahu during the night of July 24 exceeded 7 in (180 mm), including 10.8 in (275 mm) in Kaneohe. Across the entire state of Hawaii, there was no loss of life during the passage of Tropical Storm Darby, and overall the islands experienced only minimal impacts from the storm.

== See also ==
- Weather of 2016
- Tropical cyclones in 2016
- List of Category 3 Pacific hurricanes
- Other tropical cyclones named Darby
- List of Hawaii hurricanes
- Hurricane Gil (1983) – moved just north of the Hawaiian Islands
- Hurricane Dalilia (1989) – missed the Hawaiian Islands to the south, but set a rainfall record for the month of July in Honolulu
- Tropical Storm Flossie (2013) – narrowly brushed the Hawaiian Islands, sparking the issuance of tropical storm warnings
