= List of Hawaii hurricanes =

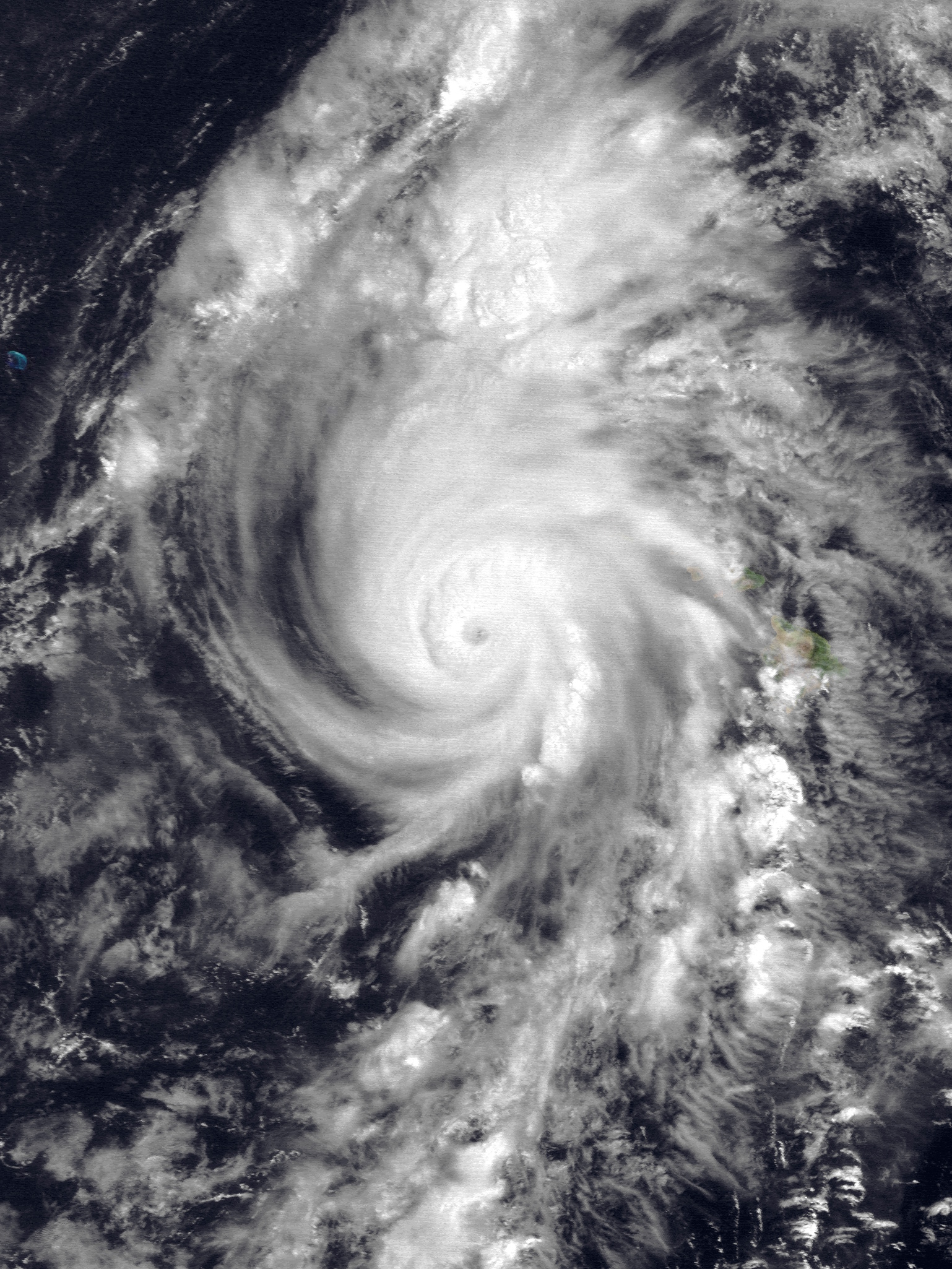
Hurricane Iniki was the most powerful hurricane to strike the Hawaiian Islands.

A Hawaiian hurricane is a tropical cyclone that forms in the Pacific Ocean and affects the Hawaiian Islands. Hawaii lies in the central Pacific, where about four or five tropical cyclones appear each year, although as many as fifteen have occurred, such as in the 2015 season; rarely do these storms actually affect Hawaii. Tropical cyclone records were not kept before the 1950s. Earlier windstorms that struck Hawaii were not labeled as hurricanes. Extratropical cyclones are also common, causing considerable damage; they are known as Kona storms, but are not included in counts of hurricanes.

== Climatology ==
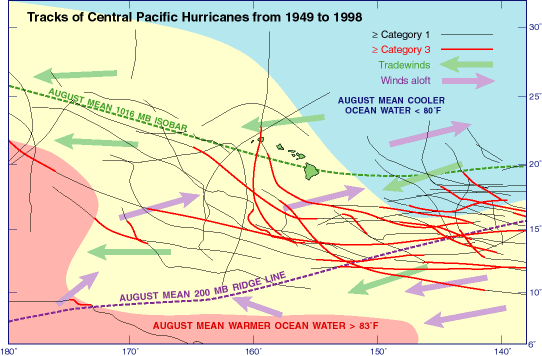
Hurricanes in the Central Pacific (140° W to 180 ° W) generally travel from east to west, however, some including Hurricanes Iwa (1982) and Iniki (1992) track in a northerly direction

The islands of Hawaii, with Kauai as the notable exception, appear to be remarkably immune from direct hurricane hits. The USGS states that "more commonly, near-misses that generate large swell and moderately high winds causing varying degrees of damage are the hallmark of hurricanes passing close to the islands." This has also drawn media attention. One notion is that Hawaii's volcanic peaks slow down or divert storms.

Wind data in particular supports the USGS assertion that hurricane damage has been low on all islands except for Kauai. Data collected by the Western Regional Climate Center show no hurricane-strength winds on any Hawaii Islands with the exception of Kauai. Despite this data, FEMA classified all of Hawaii as being in a "Wind-Borne Debris Region".

== List of tropical cyclones ==
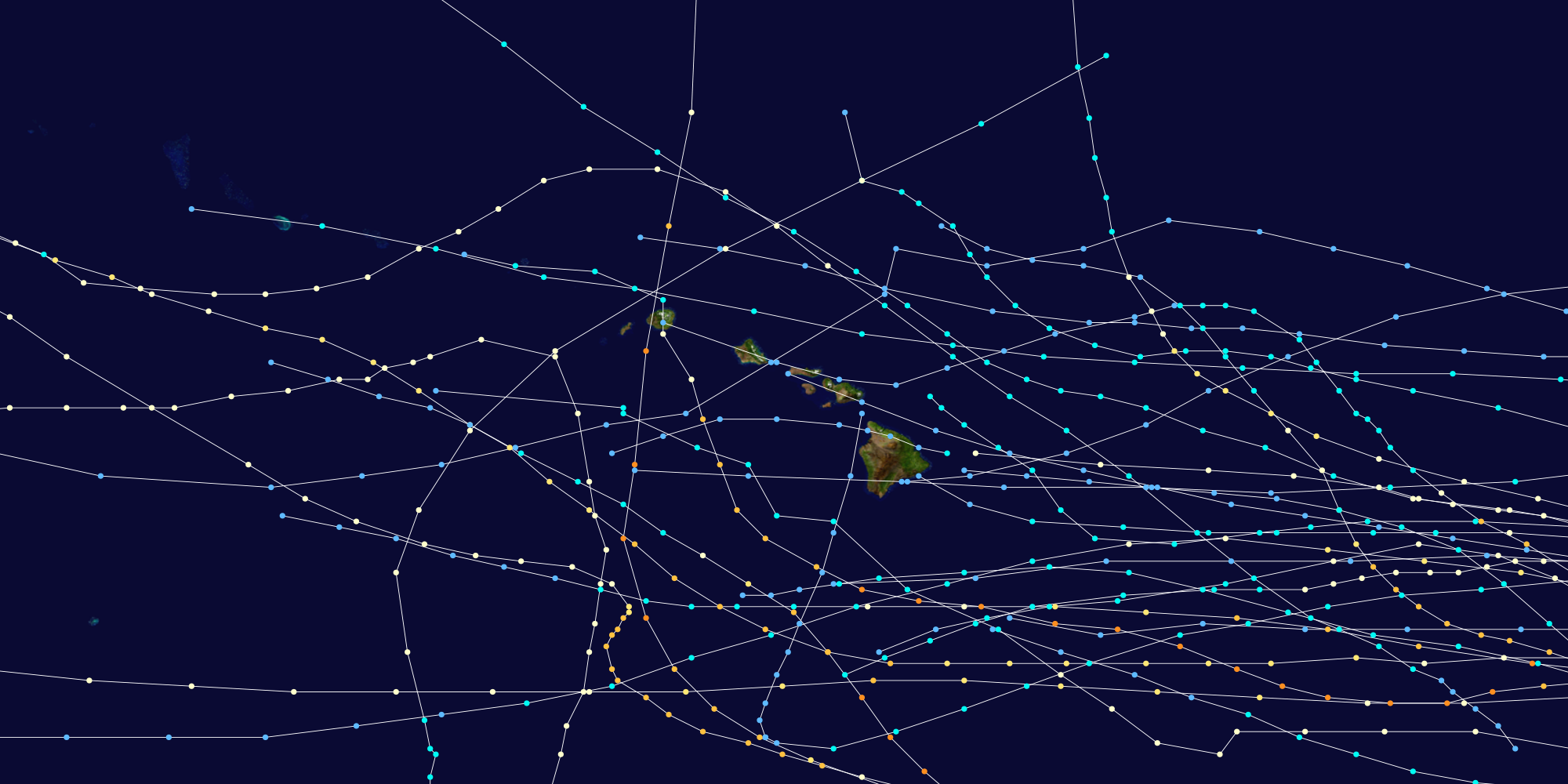
Tracks of the tropical cyclones on record before 2006 which have affected the Hawaiian Islands

This list contains every tropical cyclone that had a somewhat notable effect on the State of Hawaiʻi.

=== Pre-1950 ===
- September 1843: The earliest report of a tropical cyclone that could have affected Hawaiʻi was made in 1843. On September 23, a German ship recorded a cyclone (known later as the "Cyclone of the Lark") near 17°N and 141°W. No further records are available, but extrapolation of its forward movement predicted that it would make landfall on the southern coast of the Big Island of Hawaiʻi.
- August 9, 1871: Indigenous newspapers record a major category 3 hurricane causing significant damage across the islands of Hawai'i and Maui.
- November 1874: In November, a possible tropical cyclone may have dropped over 20 inches (510 mm) of rain on Honolulu, and southerly gales destroyed 23 homes and damaged at least 50.
- December 1902–03: A low-pressure system (known later as "The Froc Cyclone") that took a path similar to that of a tropical cyclone, passed through Kaulakahi Channel in late December 1902. No records of unusual weather were recorded, so the storm was likely still forming as it crossed Hawaiʻi.
- October 1906: In October a tropical cyclone passed about 60 miles (97 km) south of South Point. Heavy rains were recorded; "the heaviest in years". A little over 12 inches (300 mm) fell in 4½ hours.
- November 1906: 90 miles (140 km) south of Honolulu on November 3, 1906, a tropical cyclone was recognized. The storm supposedly tracked northward, passing through the Kauai channel. This cyclone must have been abnormally small or very weak, because climatological records show no unusual rainfall, wind, surge, or low pressure. The storm dissipated near British Columbia.
- August 1925: In August high seas and gusty winds were recorded in Hawaiʻi from a nearby tropical cyclone.
- August 1938: Again in August a possible tropical cyclone produced heavy wind and rain in the state.

=== 1950s ===
- August 1950: Hurricane Hiki passed north of the islands, bringing gale winds. 68 mph (109 km/h) winds were recorded in Kauai. Additionally, at total of 52 inches (1321 mm) of rain fell over 4 days in Kauai. One person died from Hiki.
- July 1957: Hurricane Kanoa, after taking a long journey across the eastern Pacific, became a non-tropical circulation a few miles east of Hawaiʻi. The remnants of Kanoa brought welcomed rain.
- November 1957: Hurricane Nina was a Category 1 hurricane that formed in November south of Hawaiʻi. Nina moved north and took a sharp turn to the west without actually striking the state. Nina's closest approach to land, which was relatively far off the coast, was only about 120 miles (190 km) southwest of Kauai. Nina caused about $100,000 damage in Kauai and dropped over 20 inches (510 mm) of rain in 14 hours. Nina set a record for the highest wind gust ever recorded in Honolulu: 82 miles per hour (132 km/h). Nina killed four people throughout the islands.
- August 1958: On August 7, a tropical storm seemed to rapidly appear directly off the coast of Hilo. It moved across the islands, dropping considerable rainfall and causing about $500,000 of damage, before dissipating.
- August 1959: Hurricane Dot was another powerful August arrival. Dot entered the Central Pacific as a Category 4 hurricane just south of Hawaiʻi. On August 5, Dot seemed to turn more northwest, aiming it directly at Kauai. On the 6th, Dot began weakening, and at its landfall in Kauai, Dot was only a Category 1 hurricane. Despite being greatly weakened, the hurricane brought gusts of over 100 miles per hour (160 km/h). In some areas of the island, palm trees snapped in half, suggesting winds were locally over 125 miles per hour (201 km/h). Damages from Dot cost no more than a few million dollars, and rainfall was relatively light; around 4 inches (100 mm). No Dot-related deaths were recorded.

=== 1960s ===
- September 1963: Tropical Storm Irah crossed the islands as a tropical depression, bringing 36 miles per hour (58 km/h) winds, but caused little damage.
- August 1966: Hurricane Connie brought heavy rain to Big Island and Maui without making landfall.

=== 1970s ===
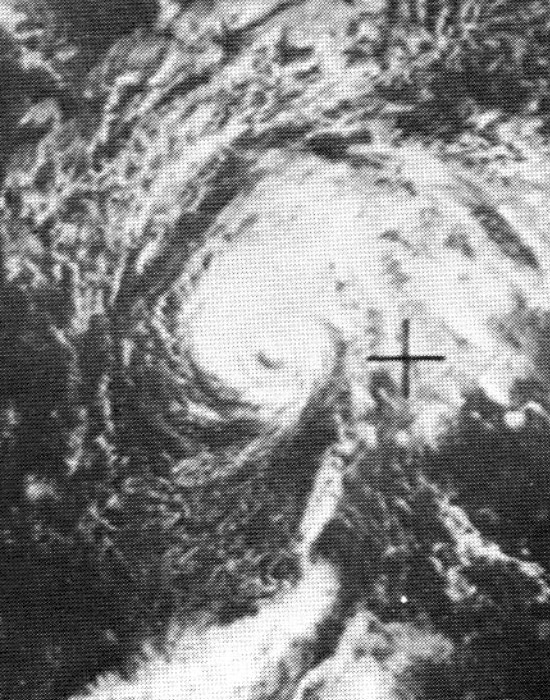
Tropical Storm Maggie

- August 1970: Tropical Storm Maggie passed just south of the Big Island, dropping nearly 10 inches (250 mm) of rain.
- January 1971: Although not having existed in the Central Pacific as a tropical cyclone, the extratropical low that was Tropical Storm Sarah in the West Pacific passed over Hawaiʻi in mid January, causing high winds and heavy rain.
- July 1971: Hurricane Denise dissipated before reaching Hawaiʻi, but brought beneficial rain of over one inch to dry farms and sugarcane plantations. Denise's outer winds helped Sheila Scott while she was flying solo around the world and a boat named Winward Passage won the Transpacific Yacht Race. Both were headed to Honolulu.
- August 1972: Hurricane Diana dissipated a few miles off shore of the Big Island, dropping over 10 inches (250 mm) of rain in some parts.
- September 1972: Hurricane Fernanda may have caused flash flooding near Waipio as it passed to the northeast.
- August 1976: Tropical Storm Gwen passed north of Hawaiʻi, dropping 1–2 inches (25–51 mm) of rain across the entire state.
- July 1978: Hurricane Fico created 15 feet (4.6 m) waves, felled trees and knocked out power across the islands.

=== 1980s ===
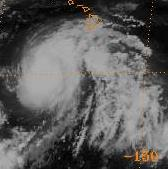
Hurricane Uleki near Hawaii and peak strength

- July 1982: Hurricane Daniel passed through the islands as a tropical depression, causing little if any damage.
- November 1982: Hurricane Iwa was one of Hawaii's most damaging hurricanes. Although it was only a category 1 storm, it passed just miles west of Kauai, moving at a speed of nearly 50 miles per hour (80 km/h). Severe property damage was inflicted on the island; up to $250 million (a record for that time). Iwa was the most damaging hurricane to ever hit Hawaiʻi until Hurricane Iniki took over the title 10 years later.
- July–August 1983: Hurricane Gil passed over northern Hawaiʻi as a tropical storm, causing minor damage.
- September 1983: Tropical Storm Narda passes south of the Big Island of Hawaii, bringing heavy rain and high surf.
- October 1983: Hurricane Raymond took a path similar to Gil's, but as a depression, causing no damage.
- July 1984: Remnant moisture from Hurricane Douglas brings heavy rain to Hawaii.
- August 1984: The remnants of Tropical Storm Kenna bring heavy rain to Big Island of Hawaii.
- July 1985: Hurricane Ignacio, although missing the islands, generated surf that measured from 10 to 15 feet (3.0 to 4.6 m) causing damage to coastal roads and structures. Only light rain was reported.
- July 1986: Waves caused by Hurricane Estelle caused $2 million in damage when they destroyed five houses and damaged several others. Two people on Oʻahu drowned in rough surf.
- August 1988: Hurricane Fabio passes south of the Big Island of Hawaii as a tropical depression, dropping heavy rainfall up to 18.75 in (476 mm).
- August 1988: Tropical Storm Gilma moved through the island chain as a depression, dropping locally heavy rainfall of up to 4 inches (100 mm) in some places.
- August 1988: Hurricane Uleki approached the state. Two drownings on Oahu were attributed to rough surf caused by the hurricane.
- July 1989: Hurricane Dalilia dropped heavy rains over Hawaiʻi, setting a new July record for Honolulu International Airport, 2.33 inches (59 mm) in 24 hours. Rain was heavier elsewhere, with up to 8 inches (200 mm) falling near the North Shore.

=== 1990s ===
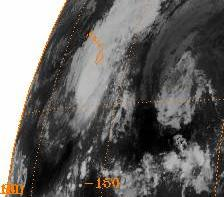
Hurricane Emilia passing by Hawaiʻi as a Category 4 hurricane.

- August 1991: Hurricane Fefa dissipated shortly before landfall. Two people were injured by lightning. Locally strong wind gusts reached 58 miles per hour (93 km/h) at some localities, mainly over Hawaiʻi and Maui. Some heavy downpours occurred, particularly on the Big Island. Localized flash flooding was reported in the Kohala and Hamakua districts.
- July 1992: Hurricane Georgette brought locally squally winds over the state as a depression. Several large waterspouts were sighted off Hapuna Beach in the South Kohala district.
- August 1992: Hurricane Javier passes south of Hawaii as a weakening tropical depression, bringing some heavy rainfall to the state.
- September 1992: Hurricane Iniki caused more damage than any other hurricane to affect Hawaiʻi since records began. It hit the island of Kauai as a Category 4 on September 11. Iniki caused $3.1 billion in damage, mainly to Kauai. Not accounting for inflation, it remains the third-costliest east or central Pacific hurricane on record, behind Hurricane Manuel in 2013 and Hurricane Otis in 2023. Six died as a result. Iniki brought winds of 140 miles per hour (230 km/h). Before Hurricane Iniki in 1992, a standard homeowner's insurance policy with extended coverage provided hurricane coverage. Since Iniki, many insurance policies exclude hurricane and a separate hurricane policy is required to obtain hurricane coverage.
- September 1992: Hurricane Orlene struck Hawaii as a tropical depression causing heavy rainfall, washing out roads, shortly after Iniki ravaged the island.
- July 1993: Hurricane Eugene dropped valuable rain on the state as it dissipated. Minor power outages and rain made traffic conditions hazardous. One fisherman was reported missing.
- August 1993: Hurricane Fernanda brought heavy surf of up to 15 feet (4.6 m) on the east facing beaches from the Big Island to Kauai. Wave heights between 15 and 20 feet (4.6 and 6.1 m) was reported on Kauai. Shoreline roads on all islands were damaged and some homes flooded.
- July 1994: Tropical Storm Daniel dumped 5 inches (130 mm) of rain over the windward slopes of Big Island. Moderate surf of up to 6 feet (1.8 m) affected the east and southeast shorelines on the Big Island.
- July 1994: Hurricane Emilia damaged trees and foliage while passing south of Hawaiʻi. Surf reached 10 feet (3.0 m) along the Puna and Kau shorelines.
- July 1994: The remnants of Tropical Storm Fabio brought heavy showers to Big Island and Oahu. Rainfall accumulated to 4 inches (100 mm).
- August 1994: Tropical Depression One-C passed just south of the islands, causing severe flooding in Hilo.
- August 1994: The outer rain bands of Hurricane John cause minor flooding on the Big Island of Hawaii.
- August 1998: Remnant moisture from Hurricane Estelle brings heavy rain and gusty winds to portions of Kauai and Oahu.
- August 1999: Hurricane Dora caused minor wind gusts of up to 58 miles per hour (93 km/h) on the southern part of Big Island as it passed south of Hawaiʻi.

=== 2000s ===
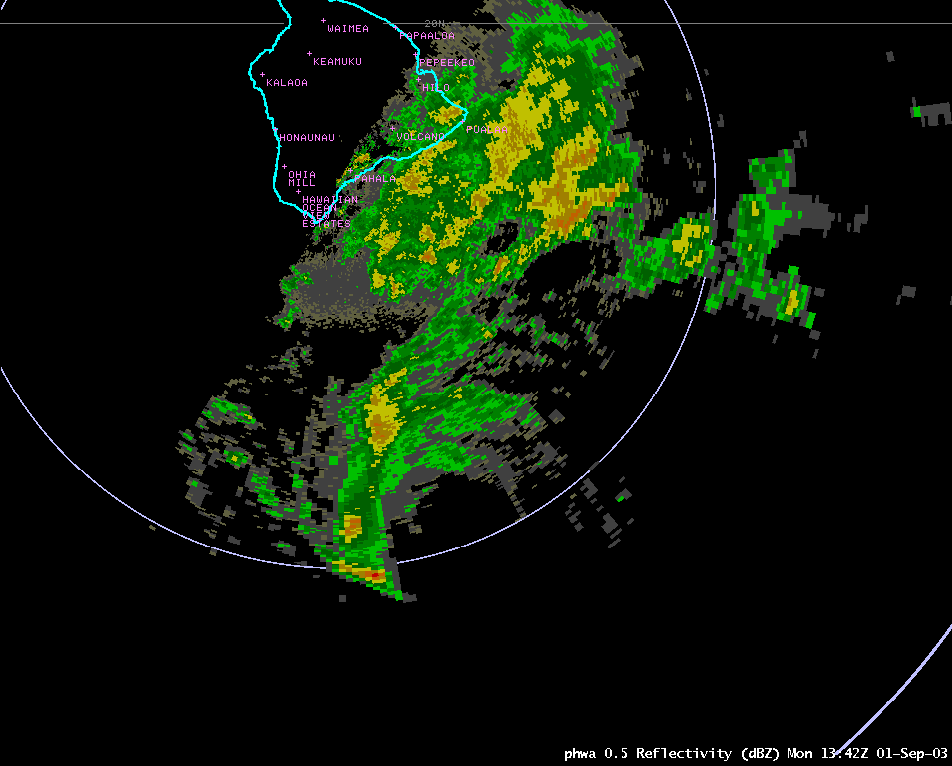
Radar image of Hurricane Jimena passing by south of Hawaiʻi as a tropical storm.

- August 2000: Hurricane Daniel passed north of the islands, bringing a few thunderstorms but no significant flooding. High surf with waves of up to 10 feet (3.0 m) impacted the eastern side of the island of Hawaiʻi.
- August 2000: The remnants of Hurricane Hector brought heavy rain to Hawaii.
- November 2000: The remnants of Tropical Storm Paul cause significant flooding across the island chain, with rainfall peaking at 38.76 inches (985 mm) in Kapapala Ranch.
- August 2003: Hurricane Jimena brought up to 10 inches (250 mm) of rain as it passed the Big Island. High surf with heights of up to 15 feet (4.6 m) were reported on the windward sections of Big Island. A gust of 53 miles per hour (85 km/h) was recorded at South Point.
- August 2004: The remnants of Hurricane Darby passed over the islands and combined with an upper-level trough to create unstable moisture, dropping up to 5 inches (130 mm) of rain in a few hours on the Big Island, causing flooding and road closures. Rainfall up to 5 inches (130 mm) was also reported in Oahu.
- August 2005: The remnants of Tropical Depression One-C cause flash flooding across the Big Island of Hawaii.
- September 2005: An upper-level trough which had resulted in the remnants of Hurricane Jova brought unstable conditions to Hawaiʻi, allowing locally heavy rainfall to occur.
- September 2005: The remnants of Hurricane Kenneth brought locally heavy rainfall, with up to 12 inches (300 mm) falling on the Big Island of Hawaiʻi. Intense rains over Oahu and Kauai caused flash floods on Kaukonahua Stream and the overflow of Lake Wilson at Wahiawa Dam. Flash floods occurred on Hanalei River forcing the closure of Kuhio Highway.
- July 2006: Remnant moisture from Hurricane Bud brought light rainfall across the island chain.
- July 2006: The remnants of Hurricane Daniel brought heavy rainfall to portions of the Big Island of Hawaii and Maui.
- August 2006: Remnant moisture from Tropical Storm Fabio brought heavy rainfall to the island chain, peaking at 15.08 inches (383 mm) in Mount Waiʻaleʻale in Kauai.
- October 2006: The remnants of Tropical Depression Four-C brought heavy rainfall to the Big Island of Hawaii.
- July 2007: Hurricane Cosme passes south of Hawaii as a tropical depression, bringing heavy rainfall that caused minor flooding across portions of the Big Island of Hawaii.
- August 2007: Hurricane Flossie passed within 100 miles (160 km) of the Big Island of Hawaii bringing rain and tropical storm-force winds to the island.
- July 2008: Remnant moisture from Hurricane Elida brought heavy showers to the island chain.
- August 2008: The remnants of Hurricane Hernan brought moisture to the island of Hawaii causing cloud and shower activity.
- August 2009: The remnants of Hurricane Felicia brought light rainfall to the northern islands.
- August 2009: Hurricane Guillermo passed north of Hawaii, generating swells up to 6 to 8 feet (1.8 to 2.4 m) along the eastern coasts of the island chain.
- October 2009: Hurricane Neki caused minor damage to the Northwestern Hawaiian Islands, striking the Papahānaumokuākea Marine National Monument as a tropical storm.

=== 2010s ===
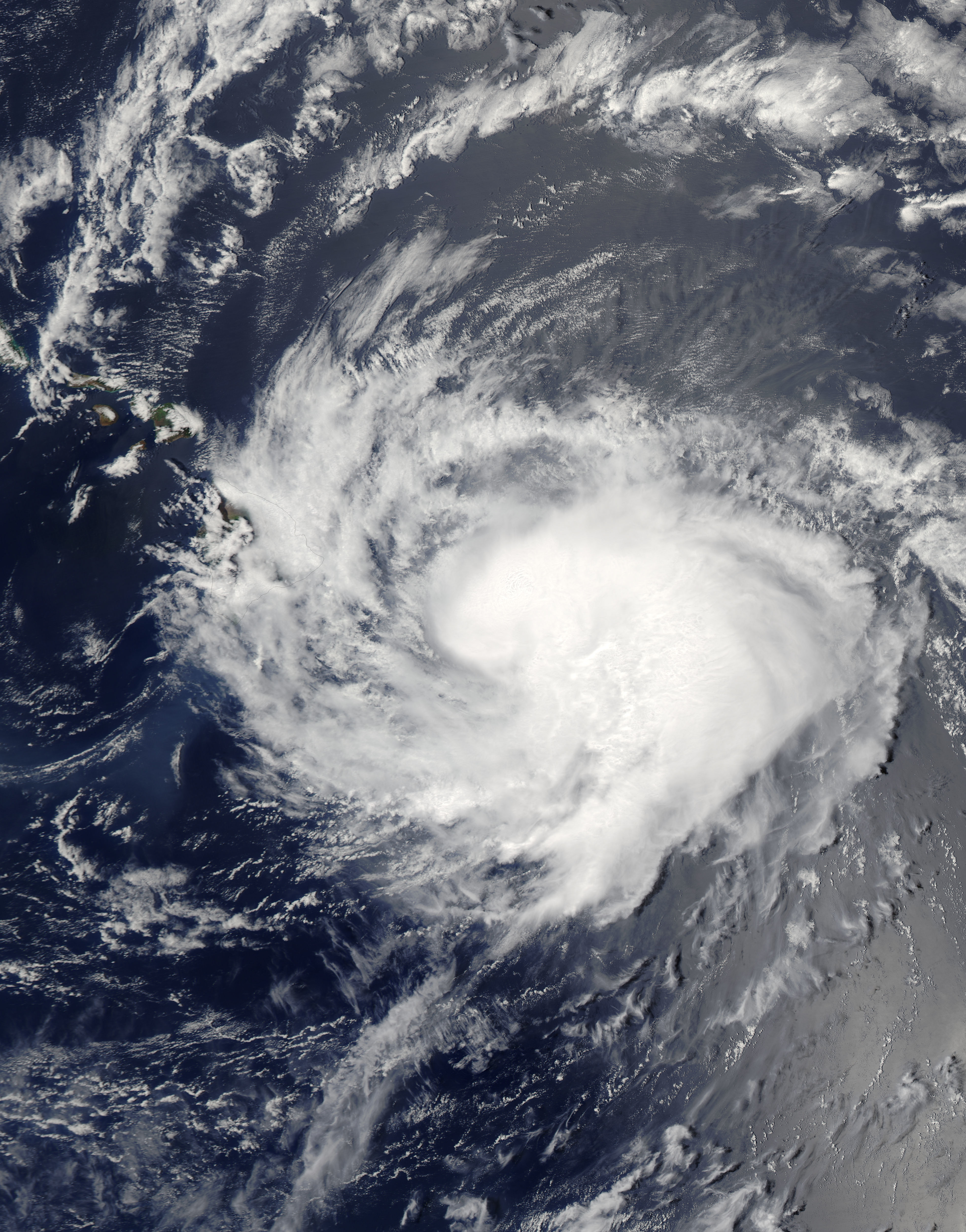
Hurricane Iselle approaching Hawaii as a minimal hurricane.

- December 2010: Tropical Storm Omeka brushed Lisianski Island as a weak tropical storm, although no damage was reported.
- July 2013: Tropical Storm Flossie passed just to the north of Hawaii as a tropical depression. Strong winds from the storm caused widespread power outages across portions of Maui.
- July 2014: Remnant moisture from Tropical Storm Wali generated thunderstorms that caused flash flooding across portions of Hawaii. A swimmer drowned due to rough seas caused by the storm.
- August 2014: Hurricane Iselle made landfall in the southeastern part of the Island of Hawaiʻi as a moderate tropical storm. Hurricane warnings were issued on the island, the first occurrence since 1992. Upon landfall, Iselle brought heavy rain, flooding and minor structural damage. Overall, Iselle caused $148 million (2014 USD) in damage, mainly to the papaya crop. One person was killed indirectly having been swept away by a stream engorged with heavy rain from the storm.
- August 2014: Hurricane Julio passed to the northeast of Hawaii, bringing high surf to the island chain. Offshore, three people are rescued after their boat encountered rough seas.
- October 2014: Hurricane Ana skirted just south of the Hawaiian islands, passing 85 miles (137 km) southwest of Kauai as a category 1 hurricane. Damage was limited to a few downed trees.
- August 2015: Hurricane Hilda passed within 200 miles (320 km) southeast of Island of Hawaiʻi as a tropical depression.
- August 2015: Hurricane Kilo passed well south of Island of Hawaiʻi as a tropical depression, it brought enhanced moisture into Hawaii, leading to locally heavy rainfall in that state.
- August 2015: Hurricane Loke brushed Pearl and Hermes Atoll as a minimal hurricane, although no damage was reported.
- August–September 2015: Hurricane Ignacio passed about 230 miles (370 km) northeast of Maui and Molokai as a category 1 hurricane, causing only minimal impacts.
- September 2015: Hurricane Jimena passed well north of the Hawaiian islands before dissipated, it brought scattered heavy rains to Hawaii.
- September 2015: Tropical Storm Malia brushed Maro Reef as a weak tropical storm, although no damage was reported.
- September 2015: Tropical Storm Niala passes to the southeast of the Big Island, bringing tropical storm force winds to the island. Flood and High Wind Advisories were released.
- July 2016: Moisture associated with the remnants of Hurricane Blas brought showers to Hawaii. Peak daily rainfall totals primarily ranged between 1 and 2 in (25 to 50 mm) and did not cause any serious flooding.
- July 2016: Large swells as high as 15 ft (4.6 m) generated by the remnants of Hurricane Celia affected the east-facing shores of the Hawaiian Islands. These swells produced rough surf that caused two drowning deaths on the southeastern shore of the island of Oahu on July 16.
- July 2016: Hurricane Darby made landfall in southeast Island of Hawaiʻi as a minimal tropical storm. Darby brought heavy rain and widespread flash floods to the windward sides of the Hawaiian Islands, however, overall damage was minor.
- July 2016: Remnant moisture from Hurricane Frank brought light rain to Hawaii.
- July 2016: Remnant moisture from Hurricane Georgette brought heavy rain to Oahu on July 31 but caused only minor flooding.
- August 2016: The remnants of Tropical Storm Howard moved across the main Hawaiian Island group on August 7, dropping up to 2 in (51 mm) of rain over portions of Kauai, Oahu, and Maui, with minor flooding occurring on northwestern Oahu and northern sections of Maui.
- September 2016: Hurricane Madeline passes to the southeast of the Big Island as a weakening tropical storm, producing heavy rain and gusty winds. Total rainfall accumulations amounted up to 5–11 inches (13–28 cm) across the Big Island.
- September 2016: Hurricane Lester passed slowly to the northeast of the islands as a category 1 hurricane. Its outer rainbands produced heavy showers and minor flooding over the leeward slopes of the Big Island and portions of east Maui.
- September 2016: Remnant moisture from Hurricane Orlene brought heavy showers to Hawaii.
- July 2017: The remnants of Hurricane Fernanda passed to the north of the islands on July 24, producing thunderstorms and heavy showers in the region.
- August 2018: Hurricane Hector passed about 200 miles (320 km) south of the Island of Hawaiʻi as a Category 3 hurricane, generating 20 foot high surf along the southern side of the island. At least 90 people had to be rescued off the shores of Oahu due to dangerous swells generated by the cyclone.
- August 2018: Hurricane Lane slowly approached the islands from the southeast, peaking as a powerful Category 5 hurricane (one of only two recorded within 350 miles of the state), prompting the issuance of hurricane watches and warnings for every island in Hawaii and becoming the first major threat to the state since Hurricane Iniki. Lane weakened significantly as it moved towards the islands, however its outer rainbands caused severe mudslides and flash flooding especially in the Island of Hawaiʻi, where a maximum of 52.02 inches (1,321 mm) of rain was recorded at Mountainview, Hawaii on August 27. In Koloa, a man drowned after jumping in a river to save a dog.
- September 2018: Hurricane Norman passed about 300 miles (480 km) to the northeast of the main Hawaiian islands as a weakening Category 1 hurricane. A high surf warning was issued for the eastern shores of Maui and the Island of Hawaiʻi, although no damage was reported.
- September 2018: Hurricane Walaka struck the French Frigate Shoals as a category 3 hurricane completely destroying the uninhabited East Island in the atoll.
- September 2018: Hurricane Olivia made landfall in northwest Maui as a minimal tropical storm, becoming the first storm on record to make landfall on the island since reliable records began. As Olivia continued towards the west, it then made a second landfall on the northeast coast of Lanai with heavy rains and gusty winds. Several homes were evacuated in Maui due to the threat of flooding, though overall damage was relatively minor, with some reports of downed trees and flooded roads.
- July 2019: The remnants of Hurricane Barbara passed 120 mi (190 km) south of Hawai'i on July 8, producing showers over the windward regions of the island and nearby Maui. The storms generated by Barbara's remnants were cited by Hawaiian Electric Industries as the likely cause of power outages affecting 45,000 electricity customers.
- August 2019: Hurricane Erick passed about 230 miles (370 km) south of the island of Hawaiʻi as a tropical storm, bringing swells and rainfall to the island. Subsequently, Hurricane Flossie approached Hawaii as a weakening tropical depression, bringing similar impacts.

=== 2020s ===
Hurricane Lowell hitting in Northwestern Hawaiian Islands as a Category 1 hurricane

- July 2020: Hurricane Douglas passed just north of the Hawaiian Islands, bringing heavy rainfall and gusty winds to the island chain, though damage was minor. Nonetheless, it was the closest hurricane that has come to Oahu in recorded history.
- August 2021: The remnants of Hurricane Linda traversed the Hawaiian Islands, bringing heavy rain and gusty winds. However, damage was minor.
- July 2022: Hurricane Darby passed to the south of the Island of Hawaiʻi as a weakening tropical storm, bringing rain and high surf. However, only minor damage was reported.
- July 2023: Hurricane Calvin passed to the south of the Island of Hawai’i as a tropical storm, bringing heavy rainfall and gusty winds to the island, but caused no significant damage.
- August 2023: Hurricane Dora passed far to the south of the Island of Hawaiʻi. Even so, a steep pressure gradient between a strong anticyclone to the north of the Hawaiian Islands and Dora to the south produced incredibly strong gradient winds over the islands which in turn helped cause multiple wildfires on Hawaiʻi and Maui.
- August 2024: Hurricane Hone passed just south of the Island of Hawaiʻi while a strengthening category 1 hurricane, bringing heavy rains, strong winds, as well as life-threatening surf and rip currents.
- August 2024: The remnants of Hurricane Gilma cause minor damage in Hawaii.
- September 2025: Hurricane Kiko passed north of the islands as a tropical storm, bringing light rain and high surf. At least 30 people were rescued from swells generated by the storm.
- August 2026: Hurricane Lala became the first hurricane to make a direct hit on the Island of Hawaiʻi since 1871. A record wind gust of 140 miles per hour (230 km/h) was observed on the peak of Mauna Kea. Statewide, the hurricane damaged or destroyed more than 100 homes and killed four people. About 200,000 customers across the state lost electricity during the storm.
- September 2026: Hurricane Lowell became the first Pacific hurricane to attain Category 5 intensity more than once since Hurricane Ioke in 2006, before turning north and passed just west of Niʻihau as a Category 2. On September 3, Hawaii governor Josh Green issued a state of emergency due to the threat from Lowell and potentially Karina. The core passed close to the west of Kauai on September 7th and 8th. Early on September 8 (UTC), a tornado watch was issued for Kauai County and adjacent waters, the first tornado watch issued for the state of Hawaii on record. Hurricane-force wind gusts knocked out power for 90% of inhabitants of Kauai. At least three deaths have been recorded from the storm.
- Late-September 2026: Hurricane Nolo was the fifth-wettest tropical cyclone on record to affect the U.S. state of Hawaii. Despite Nolo causing no significant damage in Hawaii, it brought minor flooding and caused minimal damage as it passed nearby. So far, no direct or indirect fatalities have been reported. Nolo was the fourth tropical cyclone to affect Hawaii in the 2026 Pacific hurricane season, following Hurricanes Lala and Lowell and Tropical Storm Moke. A hurricane watch and a tropical storm warning were issued for Hawaiʻi County, while several roads were closed because of flooding and landslides.

== Statistics ==
Of the 71 tropical cyclones have affected Hawaii since official record-keeping began in 1949, 32 (45%) did so during August. With only one exception, none have approached the islands prior to July.

At least 36 people have died in Hawaii as a result of tropical cyclones since 1949.

Number of recorded storms affecting Hawaii per month
Month	Number of storms
January	1
July	16
August	32
September	13
October	4
November	3
December	2

Number of fatalities in Hawaii per storm
Name	Year	# deaths
Iniki	1992	6
Nina	1957	4
Iwa	1982	4
Lala	2026	4
Lowell	2026	3
Dot	1959	2
Estelle	1986	2
Uleki	1988	2
Celia	2016	2
Hiki	1950	1
Unnamed	1958	1
Gil	1983	1
Eugene	1993	1
Wali	2014	1
Iselle	2014	1
Lane	2018	1

== Landfalling systems ==
Recorded tropical cyclone landfalls in Hawaii
Name	Date	Year	SSHWS category	Sustained winds
Unnamed	August 9	1871	Category 3 hurricane	Unknown (Note: Damage consistent with category 4 winds; rated category 3 due to terrain effects.)
Unnamed	August 8	1958	Tropical storm	50 mph (80 km/h)
Dot	August 6	1959	Category 1 hurricane	85 mph (135 km/h)
Raymond	October 20	1983	Tropical depression	30 mph (50 km/h)
Gilma	August 3	1988	Tropical depression	25 mph (40 km/h)
Iniki	September 11	1992	Category 4 hurricane	145 mph (235 km/h)
Orlene	September 14	1992	Tropical depression	30 mph (50 km/h)
Eugene	July 24	1993	Tropical depression	35 mph (55 km/h)
Iselle	August 8	2014	Tropical storm	60 mph (95 km/h)
Darby	July 24	2016	Tropical storm	40 mph (65 km/h)
Olivia	September 12	2018	Tropical storm	45 mph (70 km/h)

== See also ==
- Central Pacific Hurricane Center
- Kona storm
- List of Hawaii tornadoes
- List of Pacific hurricanes
- List of wettest tropical cyclones to affect Hawaii
- Pacific hurricane season
- Tropical cyclone
