= Hurricane Hiki =

Category 1 Pacific hurricane in 1950

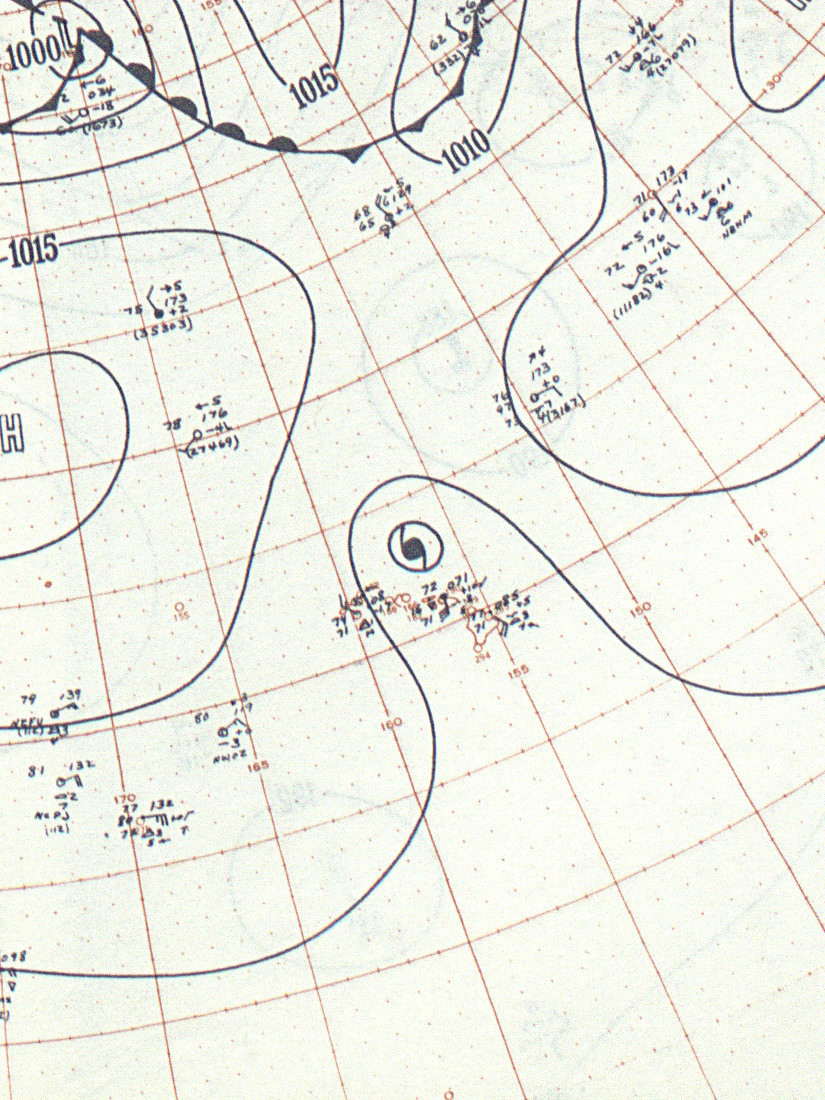
- Surface weather analysis map showing Hiki on August 15

Meteorological history
- Formed: August 12, 1950
- Dissipated: August 21, 1950

Category 1 hurricane
- 1-minute sustained (SSHWS/NWS)
- Highest winds: 85 mph (140 km/h)
- Lowest pressure: 982 mbar (hPa); 29.00 inHg

Overall effects
- Fatalities: 1 indirect
- Damage: $200,000 (1950 USD)
- Areas affected: Hawaii
- IBTrACS
- Part of the 1950 Pacific hurricane season

Hurricane Hiki was the third-wettest tropical cyclone on record in the United States, behind Hurricane Lane in 2018 and Hurricane Harvey in 2017. It was also considered the first official hurricane in the vicinity of the Hawaiian Islands. The fourth tropical cyclone of the 1950 Pacific hurricane season, Hiki formed as a tropical depression to the southeast of Hawaii on August 12. On the following day, the depression headed northwestward and intensified into Tropical Storm Hiki. While paralleling the Hawaiian Islands on August 16, Hiki strengthened into a hurricane. Around that time, the storm peaked with maximum sustained winds of 85 mph (140 km/h). The following day, Hiki curved southwestward on August 17. Two days later, the hurricane resumed moving northwestward and weakened to a tropical storm shortly thereafter. Around midday on August 21, Hiki weakened to a tropical depression and dissipated about six hours later.

Although Hiki was a small tropical cyclone and bypassed Hawaii, heavy rainfall and strong winds were observed throughout the islands. At the Kanalohuluhulu Ranger Station on Kauaʻi, 52 inches (1,300 mm) of precipitation was observed, which was the highest total associated with a tropical cyclone on record in the United States, until surpassed by Hurricane Harvey in 2017 which dumped a maximum of 60.58 inches (1,539 mm) in Texas. The Waimea River overflowed, causing more than 200 residents to flee their homes. Many streets and several hundred acres of sugar cane fields were flooded. About $200,000 (1950 USD) in damage was reported due to flooding in the city of Waimea. In Kekaha, the powerhouse suffered severe damage. Throughout the islands, winds de-roofed several homes and downed power lines; one fatality occurred after a person came in contact with a live wire.

== Meteorological history ==
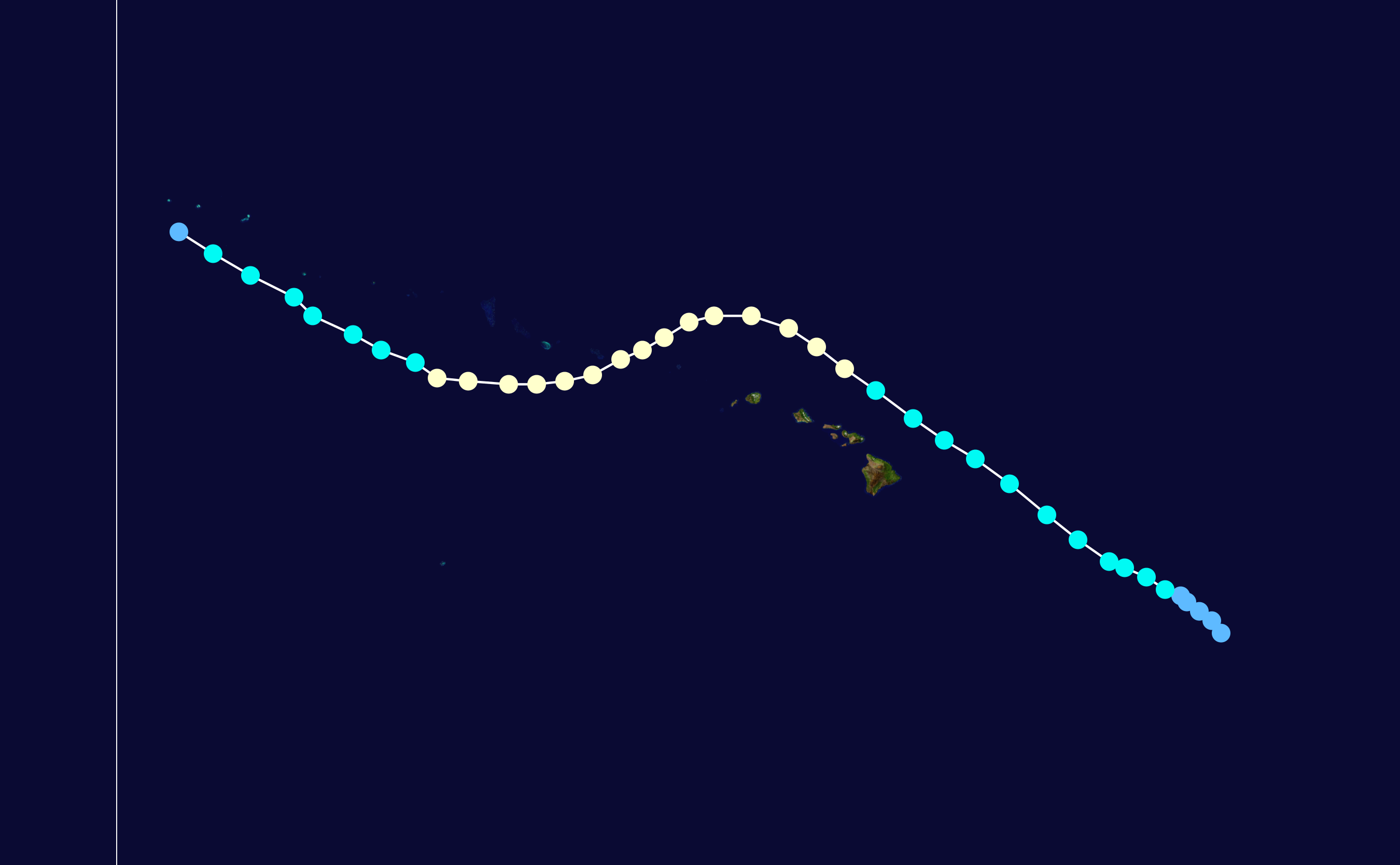
Map plotting the storm's track and intensity, according to the Saffir–Simpson scale Map key Saffir–Simpson scale Tropical depression (≤38 mph, ≤62 km/h) Tropical storm (39–73 mph, 63–118 km/h) Category 1 (74–95 mph, 119–153 km/h) Category 2 (96–110 mph, 154–177 km/h) Category 3 (111–129 mph, 178–208 km/h) Category 4 (130–156 mph, 209–251 km/h) Category 5 (≥157 mph, ≥252 km/h) Unknown Storm type Tropical cyclone Subtropical cyclone Extratropical cyclone, remnant low, tropical disturbance, or monsoon depression

According to ship reports during the summer, the Intertropical Convergence Zone was farther north than usual, which created favorable conditions for tropical cyclogenesis. According to weather charts at the Honolulu International Airport, a tropical depression developed at 00:00 UTC on August 12, while located about 760 miles (1,220 km) southeast of the Big Island. Thereafter, the storm gradually intensified, becoming a tropical storm at 06:00 UTC on August 13. It was named Hiki, which is Hawaiian for Able. While situated east of Hilo, Hawaii, the system was described as an "immature storm", and had a very small diameter. Shortly thereafter, a reconnaissance aircraft flew into Hiki and estimated that sustained wind speeds between 50 and 60 mph (80 and 100 km/h). Further intensification continued and the system strengthened into a hurricane on August 16. Upon reaching hurricane intensity on August 16, Hiki simultaneously attained its maximum sustained wind speed of 85 mph (140 km/h). Despite this, the storm had remained small, with gale-force winds extending less than 150 mi (240 km) from the center. Hiki remained between 100 and 200 mi (160 and 320 km) offshore while paralleling several Hawaiian Islands, including Hawaii, Maui, Molokai, Oahu, and Kauaʻi.

As a high pressure ridge intensified, the northwestward movement of Hiki was blocked, causing the storm to briefly turn due west on August 17. The high pressure ridge eventually influenced the hurricane to re-curve southwestward. On August 18, a reconnaissance aircraft observed sustained winds of 90 mph (150 km/h) to the south of the center; a minimum barometric pressure of 982 mbar (29.0 inHg) was also observed. After the reconnaissance aircraft flight into the storm on August 18, residents of Kauai and Oahu were alerted of a possible cyclonic loop. However, later that day, the high pressure ridge weakened, causing Hiki to turned westward and pass south of French Frigate Shoals and Midway Island. Late on August 19, Hiki weakened to a tropical storm and then resumed its course to the northwest. By August 21, Hiki further weakened to a tropical depression, and dissipated six hours later.

The hurricane was also followed by the Air Weather Service, located on Guam, who assigned the name Salome from the Pacific typhoon naming lists.

== Preparations and impact ==
Wettest tropical cyclones and their remnants in Hawaii Highest-known totals
Precipitation			Storm	Location	Ref.
Rank	mm	in	Storm	Location	Ref.
1	1473	58.00	Lane 2018	Kahūnā Falls, Hawaii	
2	1321	52.00	Hiki 1950	Kanalohuluhulu Ranger Station	
3	1106	43.54	Lala 2026	Laupāhoehoe	
4	985	38.76	Paul 2000	Kapapala Ranch 36	
5	732	28.82	Hone 2024	Volcano Island	
6	635	25.00	Maggie 1970	Various stations	
7	519	20.42	Nina 1957	Wainiha	
8	516	20.33	Iwa 1982	Intake Wainiha 1086	
9	476	18.75	Fabio 1988	Papaikou Mauka 140.1	
10	387	15.25	Iselle 2014	Kulani NWR	

Hiki was one of the strongest tropical cyclones to approach the Hawaiian Islands in at least 45 years and officially the first hurricane in the region. As Hiki approached, the United States Coast Guard station on French Frigate Shoals was alerted. On August 16, a United States Navy patrol boat evacuated the 15 Coastguardmen stationed there. The 14th Coast Guard District commander, Captain Joseph Conway, expressed concerns that the LORAN station, valued at approximately $250,000, would be swept away. In addition, ships in the area were also advised to take caution.

Hiki caused high waves on some of the Hawaiian Islands. Hawaii remained on the southern semicircle of Hiki, and as a result, light wind damage occurred. The highest reported winds from Hiki was at the Kilauea Lighthouse on Kauaʻi, where gusts up to 68 mph (109 km/h) were observed. Around there, winds downed trees, power lines, and telephone poles. The islands of Niihau and Lanai also experienced tropical storm force winds, reaching 48 and 50 mph (77 and 80 km/h), respectively. As a result, several houses throughout the Hawaiian Islands lost their roofs. In addition, a farmer in Kohala on Hawaii died after coming into contact with a live wire that was blown down from high winds. Some telephones went out of service on Oahu due to either trees falling on lines or a shorting caused by rainwater entering a cable.

More than 52 in (1,300 mm) of rainfall was observed at the Kanalohuluhulu Ranger Station on Kauai between August 14 and August 18. The rain gauge, capable of holding 24 in (610 mm) of the rain, and was emptied on August 15. However, less than 24 hours later, the same rain gauge was overflowing. Consequently, Hiki remained the wettest tropical cyclone in the history of the United States until Hurricane Harvey in 2017 dropped 60.58 in (1,539 mm) of precipitation in Texas. One year later, Hurricane Lane exceeded Hiki's statewide record, with 58 in (1,500 mm) of rain falling at Kahuna Falls. Heavy precipitation was also recorded at other locations on that island in association with Hiki, including 13 in (330 mm) on Mount Waialeale. Few reports exist on rainfall totals on other Hawaiian Islands, with the only other island recording rainfall being Maui, where precipitation reached 11.9 in (300 mm) on August 15. This was the highest 24‑hour record for that island in the month of August. On Kauai, the Waimea River experienced one of the worst floods in its history, causing more than 200 residents in Waimea Valley to evacuate. The river also rose near the mouth of its tributary, the Makaweli River, flooding the town of Waimea, causing about $200,000 in damage. Floodwaters reached 3 ft (0.91 m) above-ground on the streets and hundreds of acres of sugar cane were inundated. Additionally, severe damage was reported at the Kekaha Powerhouse.

Disaster relief and American Red Cross workers quickly opened a shelter at the Waimea Community house, which 60 families staying at for at least one night. Health officials issued a boil-water order for Waimea and considered mandating typhoid vaccinations. The Hawaii National Guard sent over 200 blankets to the disaster workers, in case distribution became necessary. Hawaii National Guard personnel also flew a plane loaded with approximately 800 lb (360 kg) of relief supplies from Hickam Air Force Base on Oahu to Barking Sands, a then-abandoned air strip, because the swollen Waimea River made the community inaccessible by vehicle from areas to the east. Two trucks then drove the supplies to Waimea. The 1949 session of the Hawaii Territorial Legislature had allocated $175,000 for flood control measures in Kauaʻi County. However, territorial public works director, Robert M. Plant, estimated that $400,000 would be required for constructing a new wall to prevent flooding. Consequently, Hawaii Republican Party chairman and politician Randolph Crossley appealed to Governor Ingram Stainback for additional appropriations and stated that territorial Representatives Norito Kawakami and Noboru Miyake and "other Kauai Republicans" favored this. The legislature approved a bill allocating $475,000 for flood control measures at Waimea, which Governor Stainback signed into law on October 27, alongside another bill setting aside $1 million in the event of a disaster in the future.

== See also ==
- List of Hawaii hurricanes
- List of wettest tropical cyclones
