= Hurricane Uleki =

Category 3 Pacific hurricane in 1988

Hurricane Uleki Typhoon Uleki
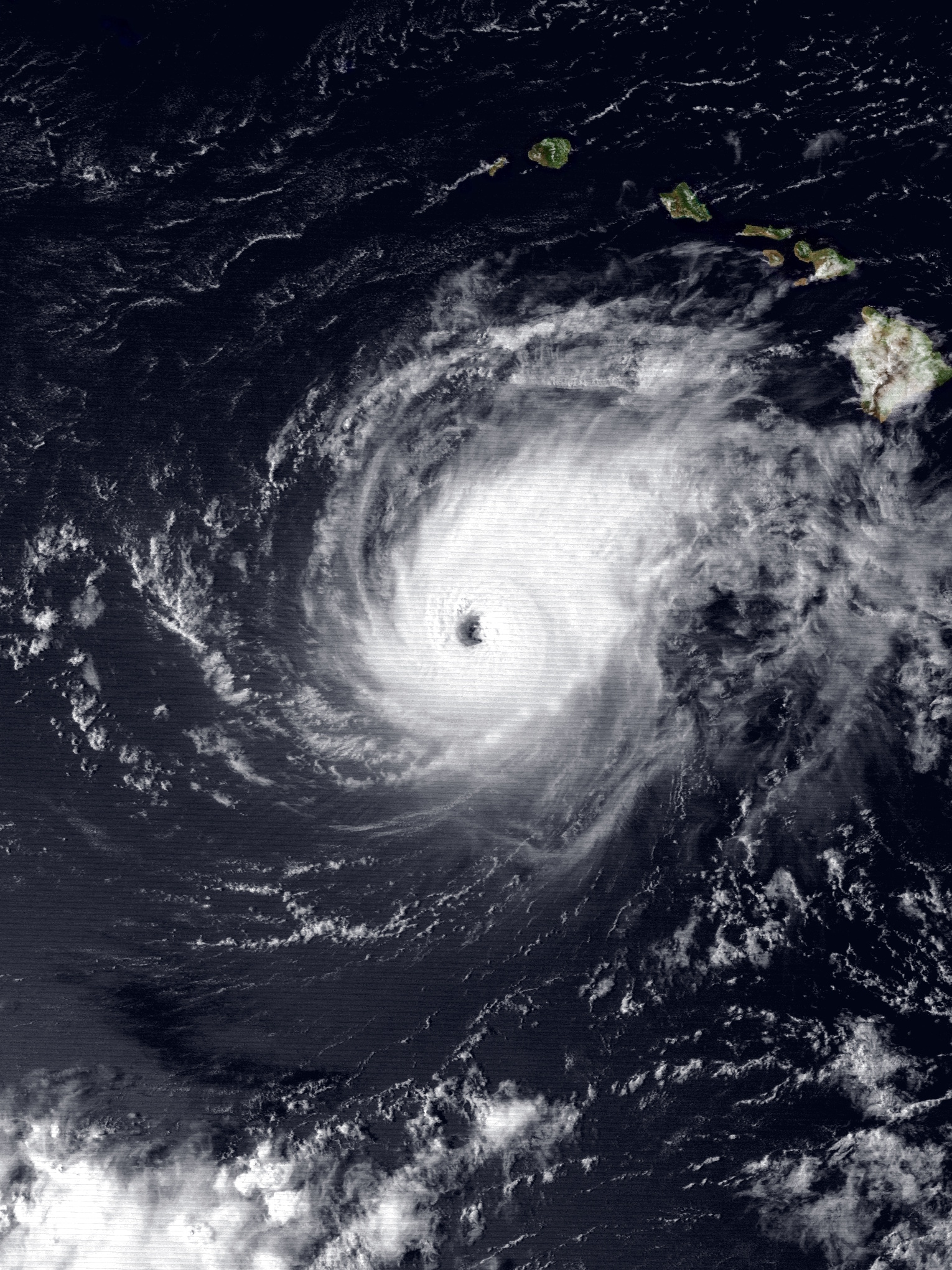
- Hurricane Uleki at peak intensity southwest of the Hawaiian Islands on September 3

Meteorological history
- Formed: August 28, 1988
- Extratropical: September 16, 1988
- Dissipated: September 17, 1988

Category 3 major hurricane
- 1-minute sustained (SSHWS/NWS)
- Highest winds: 125 mph (205 km/h)
- Lowest pressure: 957 mbar (hPa); 28.26 inHg

Very strong typhoon
- 10-minute sustained (JMA)
- Highest winds: 155 km/h (100 mph)
- Lowest pressure: 945 hPa (mbar); 27.91 inHg

Overall effects
- Fatalities: 2 total
- Damage: None
- Areas affected: Oahu; Midway Atoll
- Part of the 1988 Pacific hurricane and Pacific typhoon seasons

Hurricane Uleki, also referred as Typhoon Uleki, was a long-lived tropical cyclone in August–September 1988 that had minimal effects on land. Originating from a disturbance in the Intertropical Convergence Zone in late-August, Uleki was identified as a tropical depression well to the southeast of Hawaii on August 28. Steady organization ensued as it moved west, becoming a tropical storm on August 30 and a hurricane on August 31. Rapid intensification took place thereafter and the storm reached its peak intensity on September 2 as a Category 3 on the Saffir–Simpson hurricane wind scale. hurricane hunters investigating the cyclone found peak winds of 125 mph (201 km/h) and a barometric pressure of 957 mbar (hPa; 28.26 inHg). Thereafter, Uleki stalled for two days to the southwest of Hawaii, resulting in heavy surf across the state. The dangerous swells killed two people on Oahu.

Unfavorable environmental conditions caused weakening of the hurricane by September 4 as it resumed a west-northwest course away from Hawaii. Conditions later became favorable and Uleki acquired winds of 105 mph (165 mph) on September 7, constituting its secondary peak. The hurricane crossed the International Date Line on September 8 and was reclassified as typhoon. Remaining well away from land, the cyclone steadily weakened to a tropical storm by September 12. Gradually turning north and later east, the degrading cyclone transitioned into an extratropical cyclone four days later and ultimately dissipated on September 17 near the International Date Line.

== Meteorological history ==
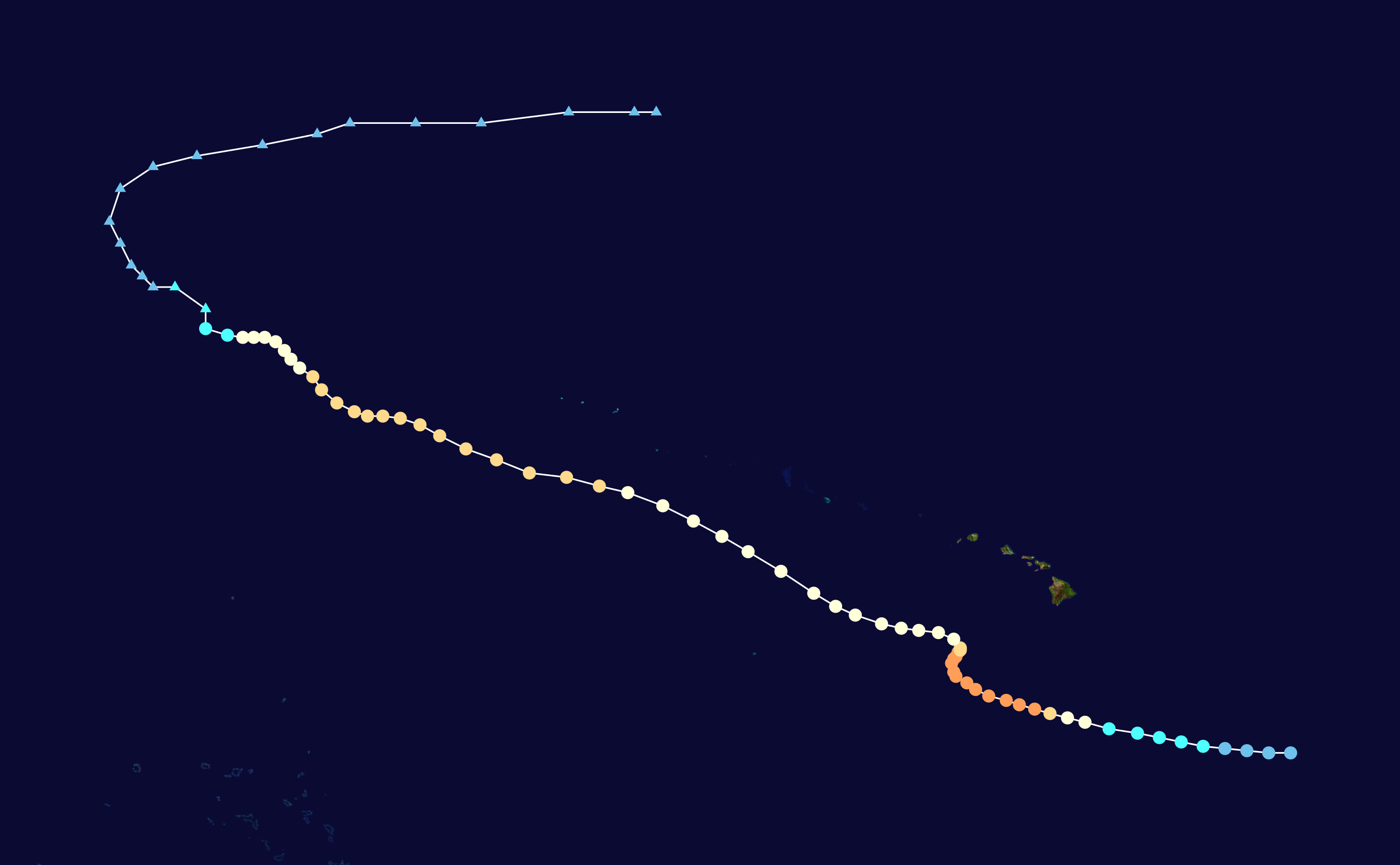
Map plotting the storm's track and intensity, according to the Saffir–Simpson scale Map key Saffir–Simpson scale Tropical depression (≤38 mph, ≤62 km/h) Tropical storm (39–73 mph, 63–118 km/h) Category 1 (74–95 mph, 119–153 km/h) Category 2 (96–110 mph, 154–177 km/h) Category 3 (111–129 mph, 178–208 km/h) Category 4 (130–156 mph, 209–251 km/h) Category 5 (≥157 mph, ≥252 km/h) Unknown Storm type Tropical cyclone Subtropical cyclone Extratropical cyclone, remnant low, tropical disturbance, or monsoon depression

In late-August 1988, increased convective activity was noted along the Intertropical Convergence Zone by forecasters at the Central Pacific Hurricane Center (CPHC). An area of low pressure subsequently developed within this disturbance and was designated as Tropical Depression One-C at 12:00 UTC on August 28. Upon classification, the depression was situated roughly 800 mi (1,300 km) southeast of the Big Island of Hawaii and moving west-northwest. Steady intensification ensued over the following day with the system attaining gale-force winds by 18:00 UTC on August 29, at which time it was assigned the name Uleki. (Note: Uleki is the Hawaiian name for Ulysses.) The storm later attained winds of 75 mph (121 km/h) on August 31 and was dubbed a hurricane as it passed 350 mi (560 km) south of Hilo. Thereafter, Uleki underwent a sudden period of rapid intensification and achieved major hurricane status later that day. (Note: A major hurricane is a storm with sustained winds of 111 mph (179 km/h) or higher, equivalent to a Category 3 or greater on the Saffir–Simpson hurricane wind scale.) After reaching this strength, Uleki's forward motion gradually lessened and eventually almost ceased altogether on September 1 as upper-level steering currents collapsed.

With the hurricane situated to the southwest of the Hawaiian Islands, Hurricane Hunters conducted several weather reconnaissance missions into the storm. On September 2, they found maximum surface winds of 125 mph (201 km/h) and a minimum barometric pressure of 957 mbar (hPa; 28.26 inHg); this corresponded to the peak intensity of Uleki. At the time, Uleki displayed a well-organized, tight circulation. The hurricane meandered in the same general area over the next two days, executing several small loops, with a slight northward drift. During this time, its circulation increased in coverage but became less-organized as weakening ensued. Increased wind shear and restricted outflow took their toll on the hurricane. The cyclone's winds dropped to 80 mph (130 km/h) by 12:00 UTC on September 4 as it resumed its west-northwest track under the influence of a subtropical ridge away from the Hawaiian Islands. Uleki passed roughly halfway between Johnston Atoll and the French Frigate Shoals on September 5. By September 7, the weakened trend halted and environmental conditions favored reintensification. As Uleki neared the International Date Line, it regained winds of 105 mph (169 km/h).

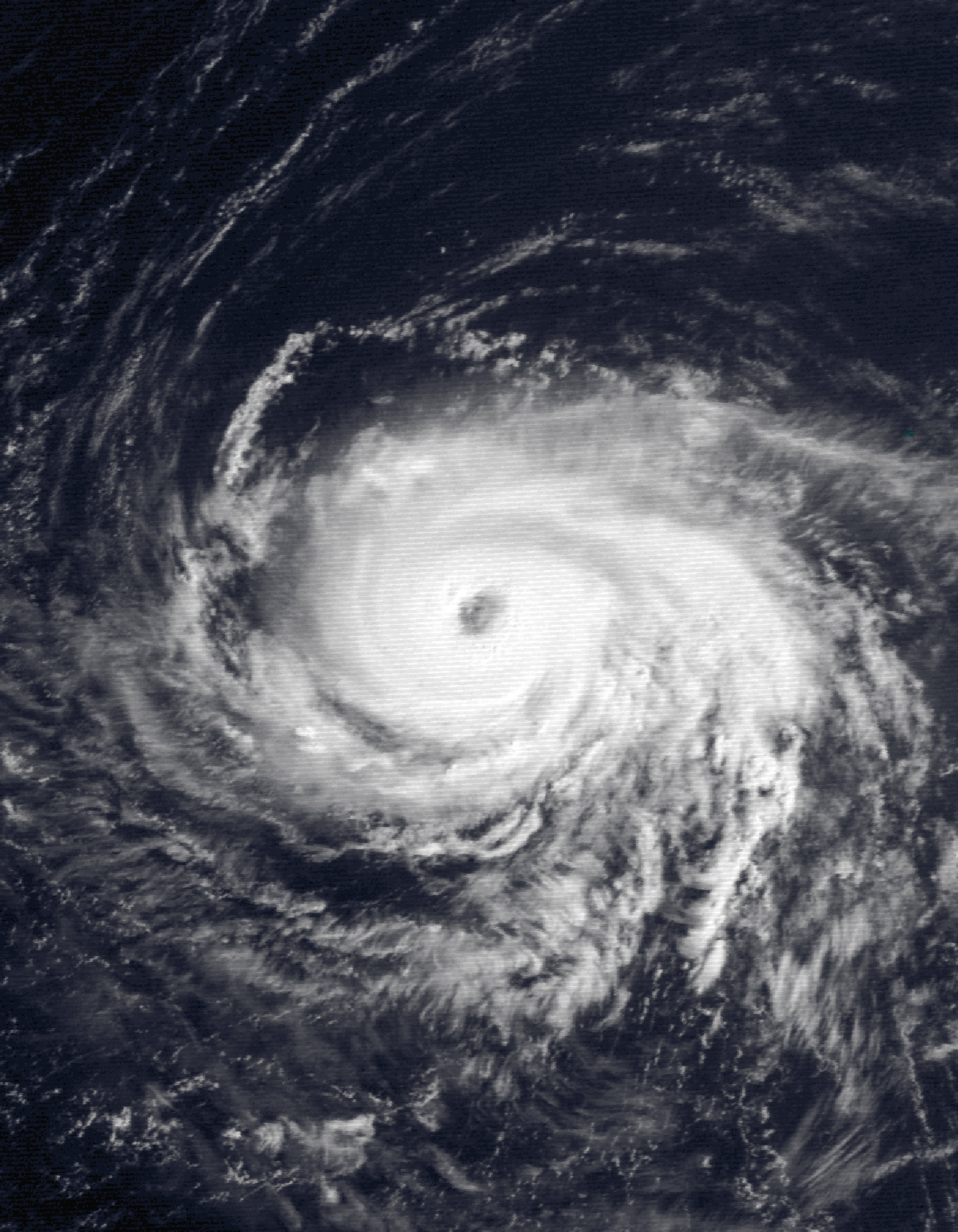
Typhoon Uleki at its secondary peak strength on September 8

At 00:00 UTC on September 8, the CPHC transferred warning responsibility of Uleki to the Joint Typhoon Warning Center (JTWC) and the storm was subsequently referred to as a typhoon. Transfer of warnings occurred when the storm was at 178°W rather than at the dateline, where the boundary between the Central and West Pacific basins exists, for unknown reasons. Three hours later Uleki made its closest approach to Midway Atoll, passing 200 mi (320 km) to the south. Shortly thereafter the system crossed the International Date Line and the Japan Meteorological Agency (JMA) also began advising on the system. The JMA estimated Uleki to have had a pressure of 945 mbar (945 hPa; 27.9 inHg) at this time; however, this value was derived from satellite estimates rather than direct measurements. Uleki maintained this strength through September 10 as it continued on its west-northwest course. On that day, the typhoon again entered a region of weak steering currents between two anticyclones within the subtropical ridge. A trough approaching from the west was forecast to prompt Uleki to turn east; however, the typhoon maintained a general northwest motion in a stair-stepped fashion. Increasing wind shear and cooler air soon imparted weakening, and Uleki degraded to a tropical storm by September 12.

Continued effects from shear stripped the cyclone of all deep convection, and by September 14 only a band of cirrus clouds remained in association with Uleki. The JTWC issued their final warning on the system at 00:00 UTC that day accordingly. The JMA maintained the system as a tropical depression as the former typhoon began turning to the east. Uleki later transitioned into an extratropical cyclone on September 16 as it accelerated to the east. The system dissipated the following day near the International Date Line, far from any major landmasses.

== Preparations and impact ==
As the hurricane stalled to the southwest of Hawaii on September 3, tropical storm watches were issued for Oahu, Kauai, and Niihau. High surf advisories were raised for all islands as well. Following Uleki's turn to the west on September 5, the tropical storm watches were discontinued. The storm's erratic movement proved to be troublesome for forecasters and they continuously warned residents to be cautious and alert should the storm double-back to the state. On September 4, lifeguards at Waikiki Beach and Ala Moana Beach rescued 19 people caught in 5 to 6 ft (1.5 to 1.8 m) swells. Further north in Oahu, two people drowned after being caught in rough waters.

The storm moved roughly halfway between the French Frigate Shoals and Johnston Island on September 5 with no adverse effects in either region due to its weakened state. On September 7, the 300 residents of Midway Atoll and United States Coast Guard personnel stationed on Kure Atoll prepared for possible hurricane-force winds from the storm. Hurricane Uleki ultimately passed 200 mi (320 km) south of Midway Atoll and produced some coastal flooding from increased surf. Some breaking waves spilled onto the runway at Henderson Field.

== See also ==
- List of Hawaii hurricanes
- 1988 Pacific hurricane season
- Hurricane Keoni (1993) – A similarly long-lasting and intense hurricane that also took a similar track
- Hurricane Kilo (2015) – Took a similar track and had a similar peak intensity
