= Hurricane Dot (1959) =

Category 4 Pacific hurricane in 1959

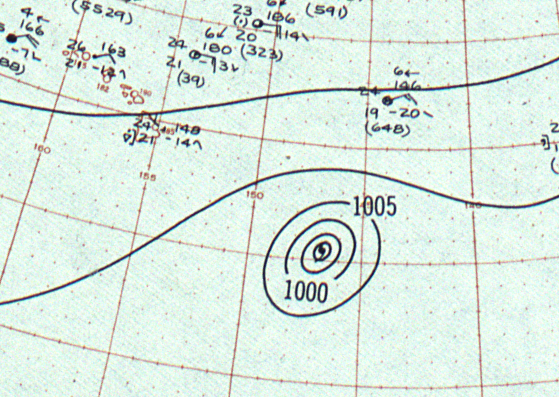
- Surface weather analysis of Dot near peak intensity on August 3

Meteorological history
- Formed: August 1, 1959
- Dissipated: August 8, 1959

Category 4 major hurricane
- 1-minute sustained (SSHWS/NWS)
- Highest winds: 150 mph (240 km/h)
- Lowest pressure: 952 mbar (hPa); 28.11 inHg

Overall effects
- Fatalities: 2 indirect
- Damage: $6 million (1959 USD)
- Areas affected: Hawaii
- IBTrACS
- Part of the 1959 Pacific hurricane season

Hurricane Dot was a powerful hurricane which affected Hawaii in August 1959, making it, at the time, the costliest tropical cyclone in Hawaiian history. Dot was first identified as a strong tropical storm southeast of Hawaiʻi on August 1. (Note: For consistency, Coordinated Universal Time (UTC) is used for all references of time as the cyclone existed in multiple time zones throughout its existence.) The storm was potentially a continuation of a previously unnamed tropical cyclone that was monitored west of the Baja California Peninsula from July 24–27, but was never confirmed due to a lack of ship reports. Dot was quick to intensify, reaching hurricane intensity six hours after naming. By August 3, Dot reached its peak intensity, with maximum sustained winds reaching 150 mph (240 km/h). Intensity leveled off afterwards as Dot tracked westward before making a curve towards the northwest on August 5, after which the hurricane weakened at a faster clip. Dot made landfall the next day on Kauai as a minimal hurricane before dissipating west of the Hawaiian Islands on August 8.

Dot produced heavy rainfall and gusty winds as it passed south of the Big Island, Lanai, Maui, Molokai, and Oahu, resulting in minor damage. In Oahu, some homes along the coast were unroofed, and damage from wave action was also reported. Damage from these four islands totaled US$150,000, and two indirect deaths occurred in Lanai. Extensive damage occurred on Kauai as Dot made landfall, producing wind gusts as high as 103 mph (166 km/h) and toppling trees and power lines. Widespread power outages affected the island, causing telecommunications and water systems to fail. Although infrastructure was damaged to an extent by floodwater and strong winds, crops suffered the most losses. Cane sugar crops sustained US$2.7 million in losses. Overall, damage from Dot across Hawaii totaled US$6 million, and a disaster area declaration and state of emergency took effect for the archipelago after the hurricane's passage.

== Meteorological history ==
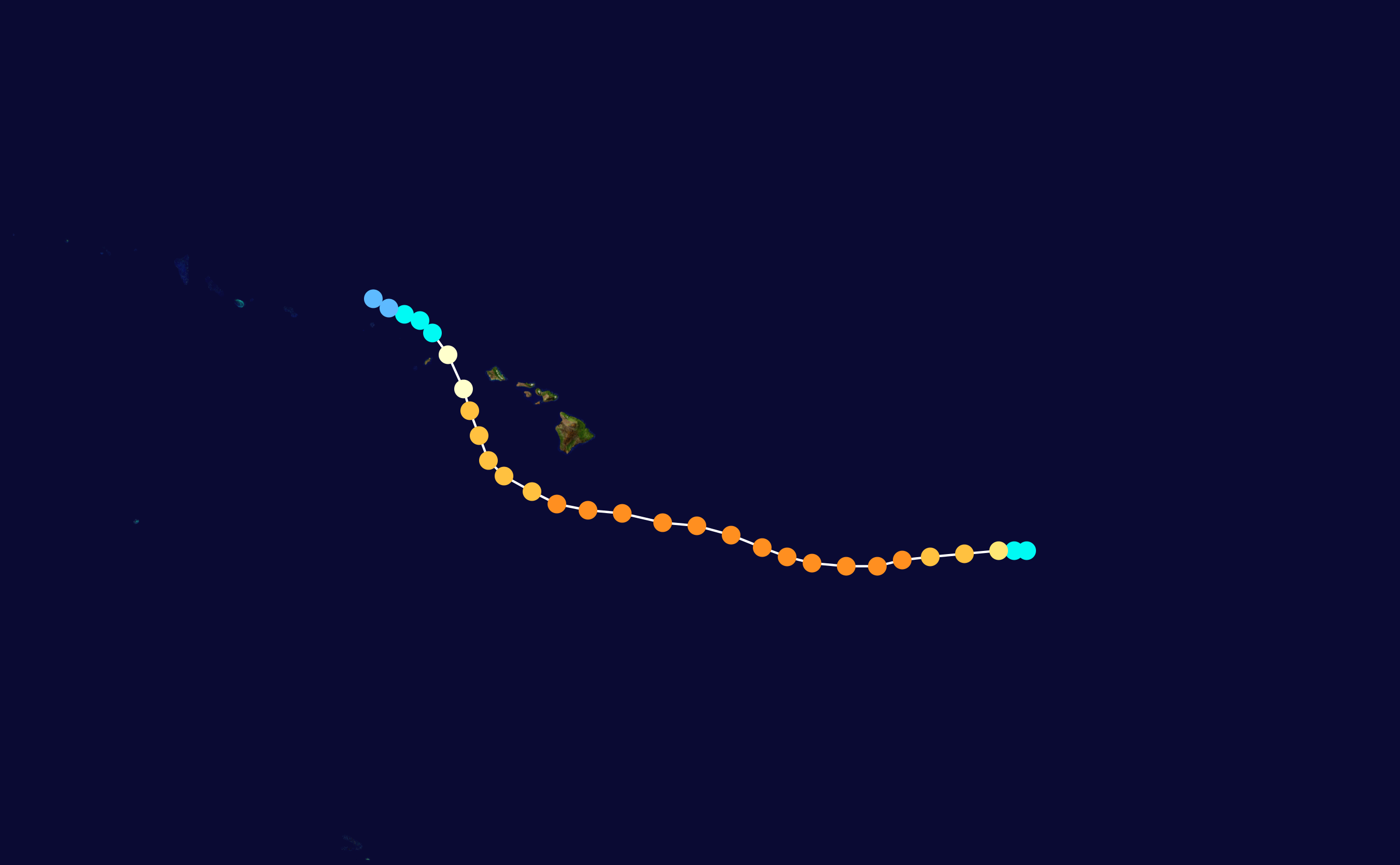
Map plotting the storm's track and intensity, according to the Saffir–Simpson scale Map key Saffir–Simpson scale Tropical depression (≤38 mph, ≤62 km/h) Tropical storm (39–73 mph, 63–118 km/h) Category 1 (74–95 mph, 119–153 km/h) Category 2 (96–110 mph, 154–177 km/h) Category 3 (111–129 mph, 178–208 km/h) Category 4 (130–156 mph, 209–251 km/h) Category 5 (≥157 mph, ≥252 km/h) Unknown Storm type Tropical cyclone Subtropical cyclone Extratropical cyclone, remnant low, tropical disturbance, or monsoon depression

On July 24, the SS Pacificus encountered a storm with maximum sustained winds meeting the threshold of tropical storm status roughly 1,000 mi (1,600 km) west of the Baja California Peninsula. Despite reports that the location of the system remained vague, the Joint Typhoon Warning Center (JTWC) began issuing tropical cyclone advisories and warnings on the unnamed disturbance. Tracking west-northwestward, the tropical storm peaked with winds reported at 65 mph (105 km/h) shortly after its discovery; however, the JTWC discontinued its monitoring of the cyclone on July 27 due to a lack of ship reports confirming the location of the tropical storm.

At 1800 UTC on August 1, an unidentified ship roughly 950 mi (1,550 km) southeast of Hilo, Hawaii reported 70 mph (110 km/h) winds within a storm, prompting the JTWC to initiate advisories on Tropical Storm Dot. Despite an apparent correlation between Dot and the preceding unnamed tropical cyclone, the lack of ship reports between July 27 and August 1 prevented the agency from confirming that the two systems were the same. Nonetheless, development upon designation was rapid as the system tracked westward, with reports from the SS Sonoma indicating that Dot had intensified to hurricane strength by August 2. Rapid intensification continued, and at 0000 UTC on August 3, reconnaissance aircraft found winds of 150 mph (240 km/h) and a minimum barometric pressure of 952 mbar (hPa; 28.11 inHg), making Dot a Category 4 hurricane on the modern-day Saffir–Simpson hurricane wind scale. Later analysis indicated that these figures constituted the hurricane's peak intensity.

After peaking, Dot slightly weakened, but maintained its Category 4 status for more than two days; during that time it boasted an unusually large eye spanning as much as 40 mi (65 km) in diameter. Late on August 4, a fourth reconnaissance flight into the storm found surface winds of 160 mph (260 km/h), but this reading was discounted on the basis that pressures were unusually high for a storm of that intensity. On August 5, Dot passed 90 mi (145 km) south of Ka Lae before the storm curved sharply towards the northwest late that day. A more definite weakening phase began after this point, and during the night of August 6, Dot made landfall on Kauai with winds estimated at 85 mph (140 km/h), making the storm a Category 1-equivalent at the time of landfall. After traversing the island, Dot was downgraded to tropical storm intensity and curved back to the west, before eventually dissipating on August 8.

== Preparations, impact, and aftermath ==
On August 3, the United States Weather Bureau issued a hurricane watch for coastal areas of the Big Island in Kau and Puna districts. As Dot swept by the Hawaiian islands, various gale warnings and small craft warnings shifted westward to reflect the hurricane's predicted path. Due to the storm's sudden northward shift in movement, hurricane warnings were issued for portions of Oahu and the Kauai channel before being issued for only the island of Kauai. All watches and warnings were discontinued on August 7 after Dot weakened below hurricane intensity. Disaster workers in Oahu and Kauai were warned by civil defense agencies and the American Red Cross to prepare for emergency. Roughly 400 people fled from the beaches of Kauai due to the threat of storm surge, with an additional 500 people being evacuated by authorities as the storm neared the island. After the storm caused flooding in Kauai, nearly 1,000 people evacuated out of submerged areas into schools, armories, and public facilities repurposed as emergency shelters.

Passing well to the south of the Big Island, Lanai, Maui, Molokai, and Oahu, damage from Dot on these islands was minor. Rainfall on the Big Island peaking at 4 in (100 mm) caused localized flooding in some areas, while wave damage occurred at Ka Lae and along the island's Kona coast. Winds at a station on Ka Lae reached 85 mph (140 km/h). Flooding also occurred on Oahu, and along the coast homes were unroofed and cars were damaged by flying projectiles after being subjected to winds estimated at 60 mph (95 km/h). Off of Lanai, a tugboat captain was indirectly killed after he slipped between two boats in rough seas while attempting to board another ship, crushing him. Another indirect death occurred on Lanai in a traffic incident resulting from Dot's rainfall. Damage on the Hawaiian islands outside of Kauai was estimated at $150,000.

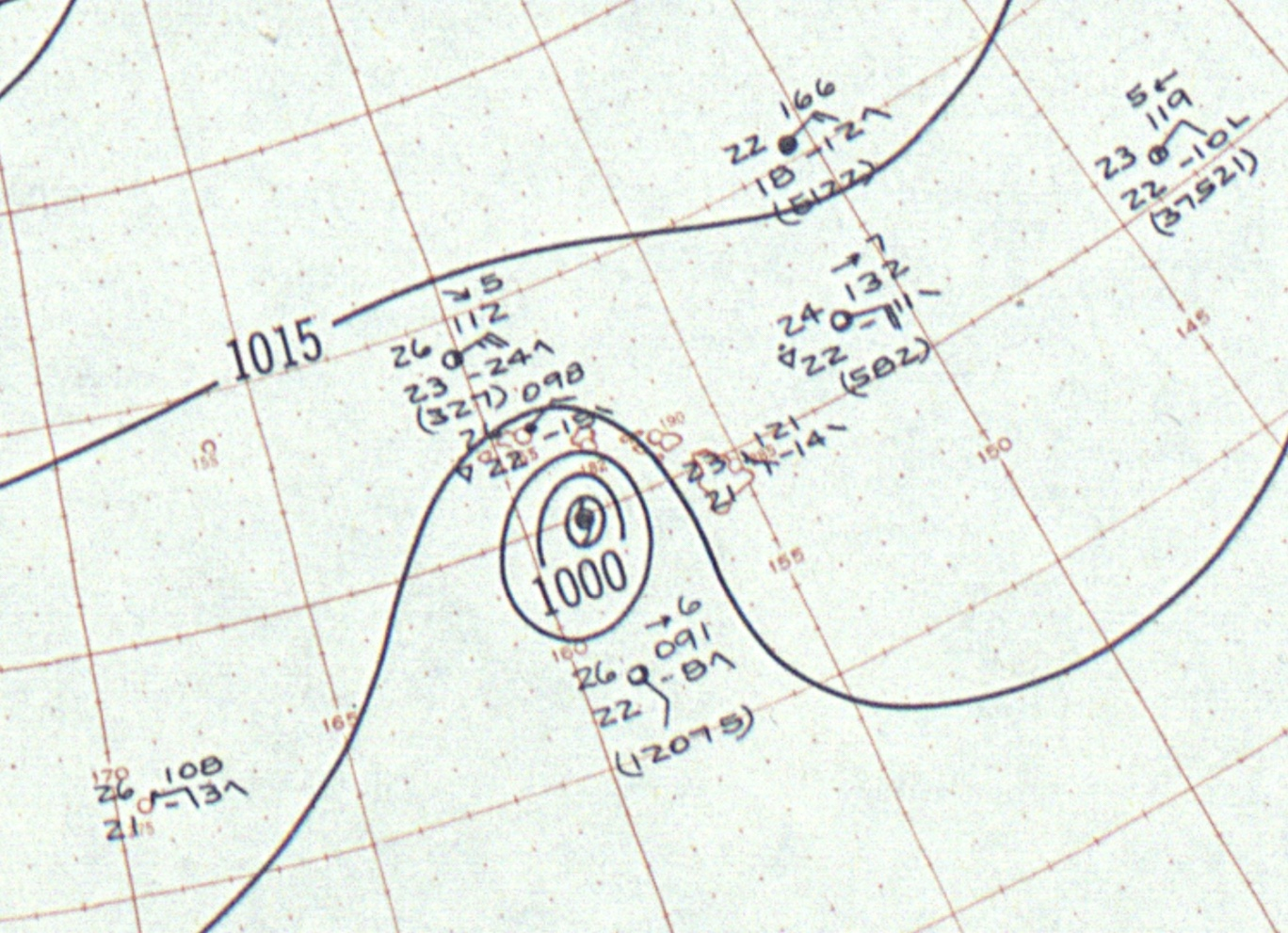
Synoptic weather map of Hurricane Dot nearing landfall on Kauaʻi, Hawaii on August 6

Rough surf along the coasts of Kauai combined with torrential rainfall to produce widespread coastal flooding. Waves at Port Allen peaked at 35 ft (10.7 m). Pineapple plantations were inundated, with losses exceeding US$200,000. Infrastructure damage as a result of wave action was spotty but nonetheless amounted to US$100,000. The August 1959 rainfall total in Lihue, largely attributed to Dot, measured 8.13 in (207 mm), 6 in (150 mm) in excess of normal. The heavy rainfall caused rivers and streams to swell and inundate adjacent areas. Despite making landfall as a weak Category 1 hurricane, Dot brought damaging winds inland, with a maximum wind gust of 103 mph (166 km/h) reported at Kilauea Light. However, gusts as high as 125 mph (200 km/h) were estimated given the snapping of palm trees. Strong winds damaged hundreds of buildings in the areas of Kilauea, Lihue, and Lawai, Hawaii. Extensive losses resulted from the damaging and toppling of macadamia trees. However, of the crops on Kauai, cane suffered the greatest impact with damage figures reaching US$2.7 million. The toppling of power lines caused power outages across the island; fallen lines also blocked roads. Water supply to some communities failed due to the lack of electricity. With the exception of emergency radio transmitters, telecommunications on Kauai failed. The damage toll from Dot for the entirety of Hawaiʻi totaled US$6 million, making the hurricane the costliest in Hawaiian history before it was surpassed by hurricanes Iwa, Iniki and Iselle in 1982, 1992 and 2014, respectively. Adjusted for inflation, Dot's damage figure nears US$50 million.

Due to the damage wrought by Dot on Kauai, the island was declared a major disaster area. Stepping in for governor William F. Quinn, Hawaiian secretary Edward E. Johnston declared a state of emergency for Hawaii and allocated funds towards the repairing of roads and public property. The United States Weather Bureau awarded the SS Sonoma a public service award on October 7, 1959 for serving as reconnaissance for Hurricane Dot throughout its existence.

== See also ==
- Other tropical cyclones named Dot
- Hurricane Iwa (1982)
- Hurricane Gil (1983)
- Hurricane Iniki (1992)
- Hurricane Lane (2018)
- Hurricane Lowell (2026)
- List of Hawaii hurricanes
