= List of storms named Moke =

The name Moke has been used for two tropical cyclones in the Central Pacific Ocean:

- Tropical Storm Moke (1984) – moved through open waters west of the Northwestern Hawaiian Islands
- Tropical Storm Moke (2026) – weak storm that stayed at sea
