= Timeline of the 2026 Pacific hurricane season =

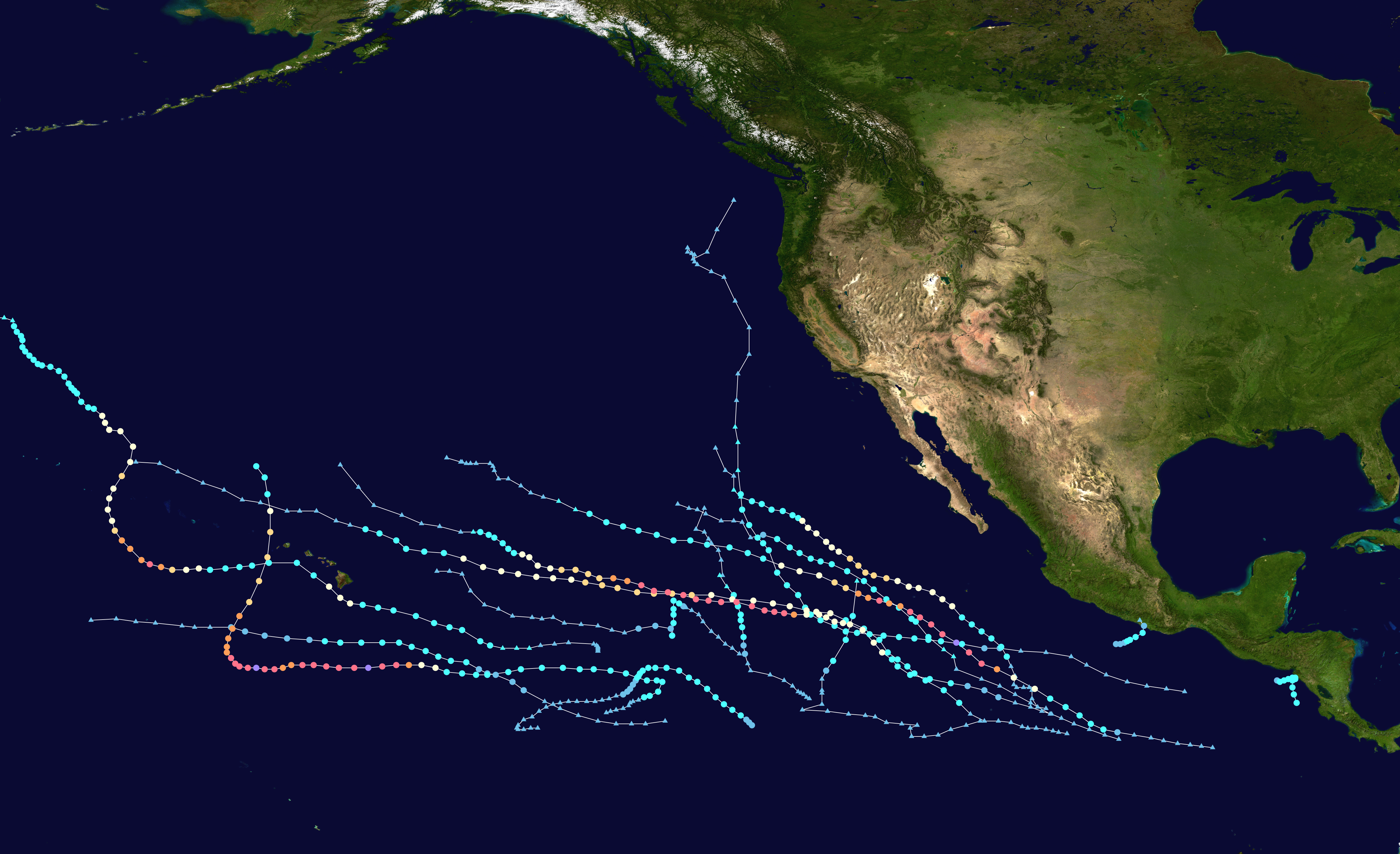
- Season summary map

Season boundaries
- First system formed: June 2, 2026
- Last system dissipated: Season ongoing

Strongest system
- Name: Polo
- Maximum winds: 180 mph (285 km/h) (1-minute sustained)
- Lowest pressure: 892 mbar (hPa; 26.34 inHg)

Longest lasting system
- Name: Lala
- Duration: 14.75 days
Storm articles
- Tropical Storm Boris (2026)
- Tropical Storm Cristina (2026)
- Hurricane Lala
- Hurricane Lowell
- Hurricane Nolo
- Hurricane Polo

The 2026 Pacific hurricane season is the current iteration of the annual cycle of tropical cyclone formation over the Pacific Ocean north of the equator and east of the International Date Line (IDL). The season officially began on May 15 in the Eastern Pacific basin proper (east of 140°W) and June 1 in the Central Pacific basin (140°W to the IDL), and will end on November 30 in both areas. This is historically the period during which most tropical cyclogenesis occurs in these respective areas. Activity during the season began on June 2 with the formation of Tropical Storm Amanda.

This timeline documents tropical cyclone formations, strengthening, weakening, landfalls, and dissipations during the season. It includes information that was not released throughout the season, meaning that data from post-storm reviews by the National Hurricane Center has been included.

The time stamp for each event is first stated using Coordinated Universal Time (UTC), the 24-hour clock where 00:00 = midnight UTC. The NHC uses both UTC and the time zone where the center of the tropical cyclone is currently located. The time zones utilized (east to west) are: Central, Mountain, Pacific and Hawaii. In this timeline, the respective area time is included in parentheses. Additionally, figures for maximum sustained winds and position estimates are rounded to the nearest 5 units (miles, or kilometers), following National Hurricane Center practice. Direct wind observations are rounded to the nearest whole number. Atmospheric pressures are listed to the nearest millibar and nearest hundredth of an inch of mercury.

== Timeline of events ==
=== May ===
May 15

- The 2026 Eastern Pacific hurricane season officially begins.

=== June ===
June 1

- The 2026 Central Pacific hurricane season officially begins.

June 2

- 12:00 UTC (5:00 a.m. PDT) at 9.2°N 126.3°W – Tropical Depression One-E develops from a broad low-pressure area while located about 1,440 mi (2,315 km) southwest of the southern tip of the Baja California peninsula.

June 3

- 06:00 UTC (11:00 p.m. PDT, June 2) at 9.9°N 127.1°W – Tropical Depression One-E strengthens into Tropical Storm Amanda while located about 1,445 mi (2,325 km) southwest of the southern tip of the Baja California peninsula.

June 4

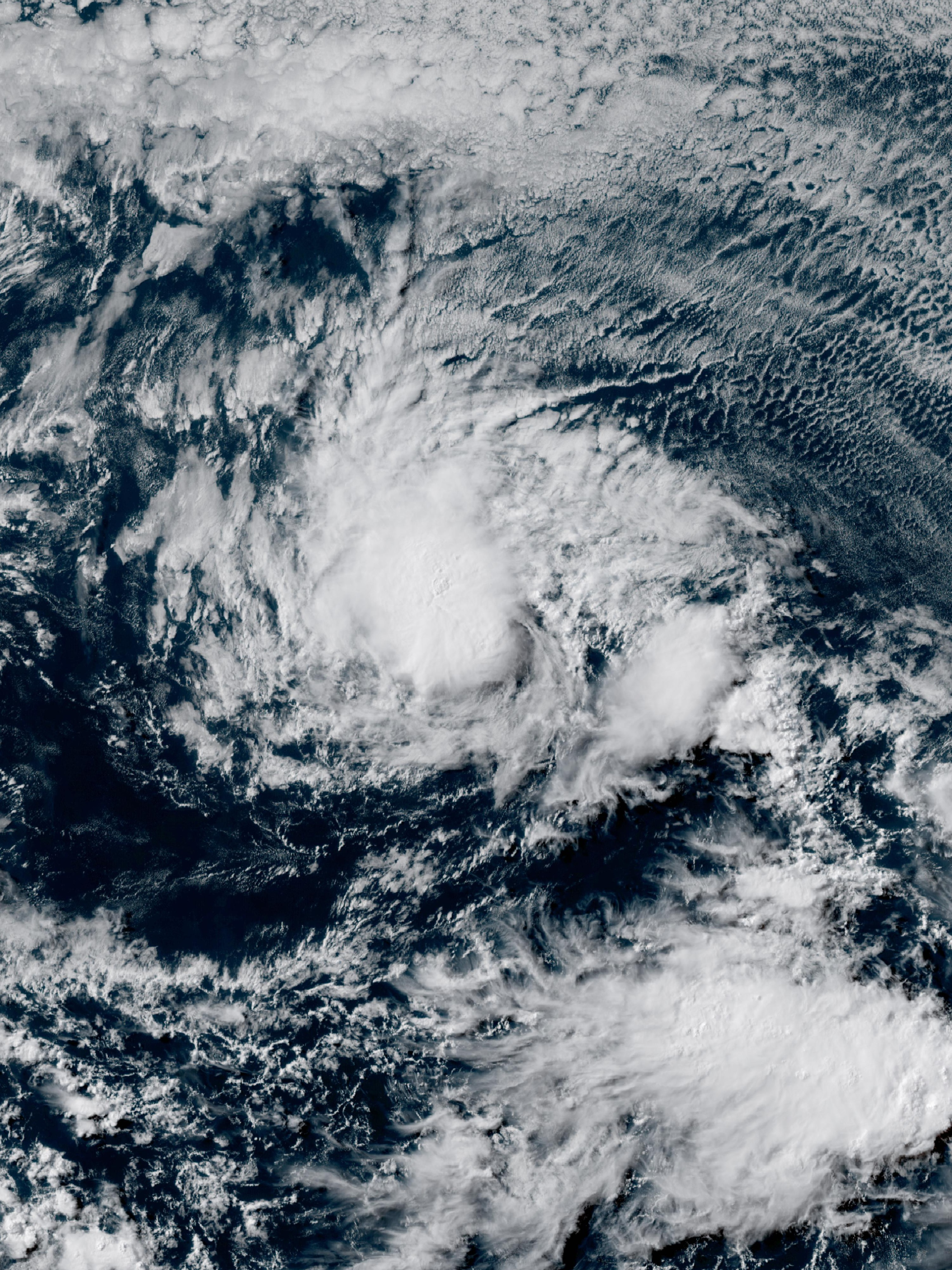
Tropical Storm Amanda at peak intensity early on June 5

- 18:00 UTC (11:00 a.m. PDT) at 12.6°N 130.8°W – Tropical Storm Amanda attains its peak intensity, with maximum sustained winds of 50 mph (85 km/h) and a minimum central pressure of 1003 mbar (29.62 inHg), while located about 1,540 mi (2,480 km) west-southwest of the southern tip of the Baja California peninsula.

June 6

- 18:00 UTC (11:00 a.m. PDT) at 12.4°N 134.6°W – Tropical Storm Amanda weakens into a tropical depression while located about 1,770 mi (2,850 km) west-southwest of the southern tip of the Baja California peninsula.

June 7

- 15:00 UTC (9:00 a.m. CST) at 15.5°N 99.9°W – Tropical Depression Two-E develops from a low-pressure area while located about 95 mi (155 km) south of Acapulco, Guerrero.

June 8

- 00:00 UTC (5:00 p.m. PDT, June 7) at 11.3°N 136.0°W – Tropical Depression Amanda degenerates into a remnant low while located about 1,895 mi (3,045 km) west-southwest of the southern tip of the Baja California peninsula, and later dissipates.
- 06:00 UTC (12:00 midnight CST) at 10.8°N 87.4°W – Tropical Storm Cristina develops from a monsoon trough while located about 105 mi (165 km) off the Pacific coast of Nicaragua.
- 09:00 UTC (3:00 a.m. PDT) at 15.9°N 99.2°W – Tropical Depression Two-E strengthens into Tropical Storm Boris while located about 85 mi (135 km) southeast of Acapulco.
- 12:00 UTC (6:00 a.m. CST) at 11.4°N 87.6°W – Tropical Storm Cristina attains its peak intensity, with maximum sustained winds of 50 mph (85 km/h) and a minimum central pressure of 1002 mbar (29.59 inHg), while located about 105 mi (165 km) west of Managua, Nicaragua.
- 18:00 UTC (12:00 noon CST) at 15.3°N 99.2°W – Tropical Storm Boris attains its peak intensity, with maximum sustained winds of 45 mph (75 km/h) and a minimum central pressure of 1001 mbar (29.56 inHg), while located about 120 mi (195 km) south-southeast of Acapulco.

June 9

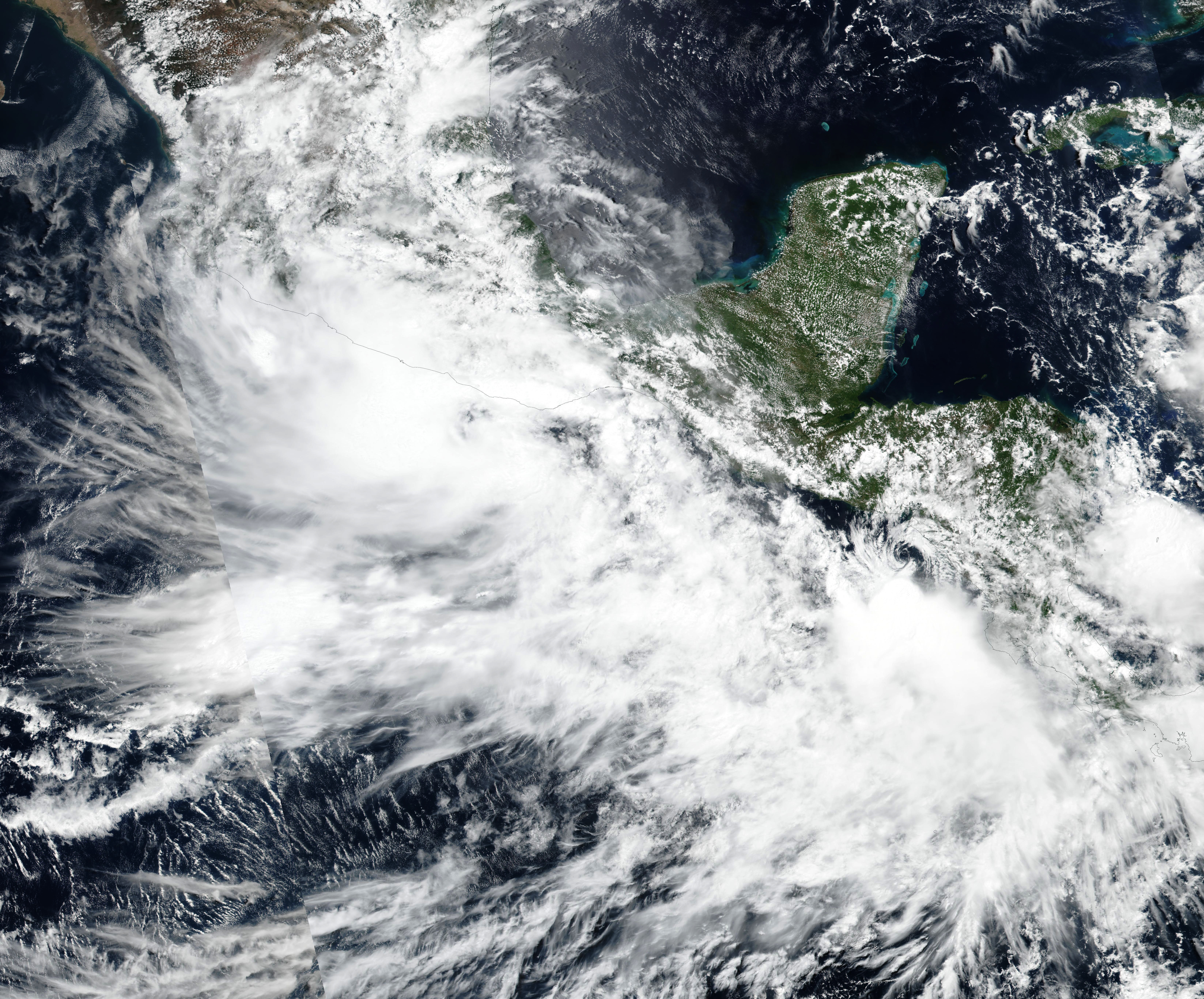
Tropical storms Boris (top left) and Cristina (middle right) on June 8

- <09:00 UTC (3:00 a.m. CST) near 16.4°N 98.4°W – Tropical Storm Boris makes landfall near Punta Maldonado, Guerrero.
- 12:00 UTC (6:00 a.m. CST) at 16.7°N 98.5°W – Tropical Storm Boris weakens into a tropical depression over land while located about 30 mi (45 km) north-northeast of Punta Maldonado.
- 15:00 UTC (9:00 a.m. CST) at 16.9°N 98.9°W – Tropical Depression Boris degenerates into a remnant low over land while located about 45 mi (75 km) north-northwest of Punta Maldonado.

June 10

- 18:00 UTC (12:00 noon CST) at 12.4°N 88.8°W – Tropical Storm Cristina weakens into a tropical depression just off the coast of El Salvador, dissipating shortly thereafter.

=== July ===
July 1

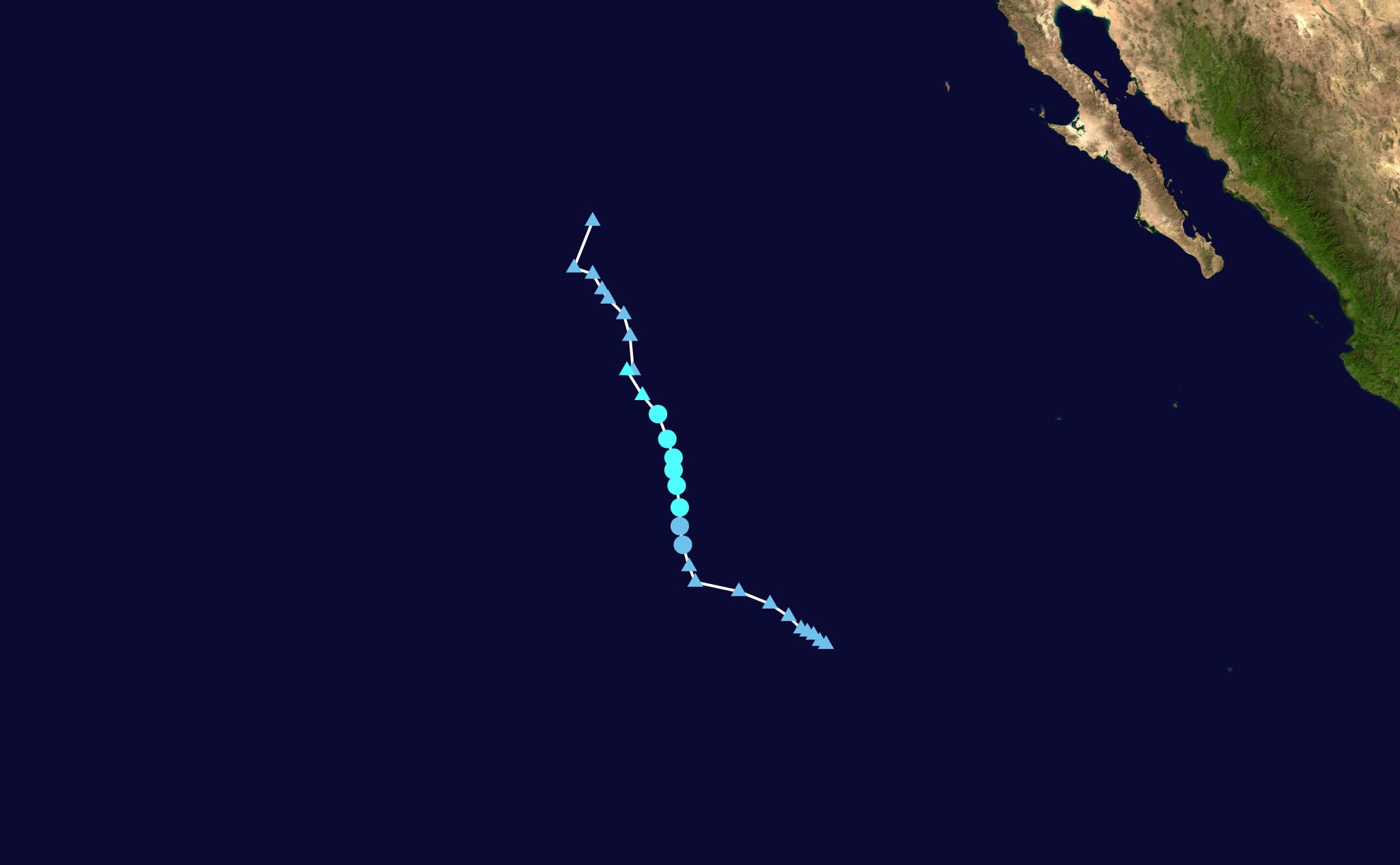
Storm track of Tropical Storm Douglas

- 09:00 UTC (2:00 a.m. PDT) at 14.5°N 126.9°W – Tropical Depression Four-E develops from a low-pressure area while located about 1,250 mi (2,015 km) west-southwest of the southern tip of the Baja California peninsula.
- 21:00 UTC (2:00 p.m. PDT) at 15.7°N 127.0°W – Tropical Depression Four-E strengthens into Tropical Storm Douglas while located about 1,220 mi (1,960 km) west-southwest of the southern tip of the Baja California peninsula. It simultaneously attains its peak intensity, with maximum sustained winds of 40 mph (65 km/h) and a minimum central pressure of 1003 mbar (29.62 inHg).

July 3

- 09:00 UTC (2:00 a.m. PDT) at 19.4°N 128.3°W – Tropical Storm Douglas transitions into a post-tropical cyclone while located about 1,210 mi (1,945 km) west of the southern tip of the Baja California peninsula.

July 14

- 21:00 UTC (2:00 p.m. MST) at 14.8°N 109.2°W – Tropical Depression Five-E develops from an area of unsettled weather while located about 560 mi (905 km) south of the southern tip of the Baja California peninsula.

July 15

- 09:00 UTC (2:00 a.m. MST) at 14.9°N 111.8°W – Tropical Depression Five-E strengthens into Tropical Storm Elida while located about 565 mi (910 km) south-southwest of the southern tip of the Baja California peninsula.

July 18

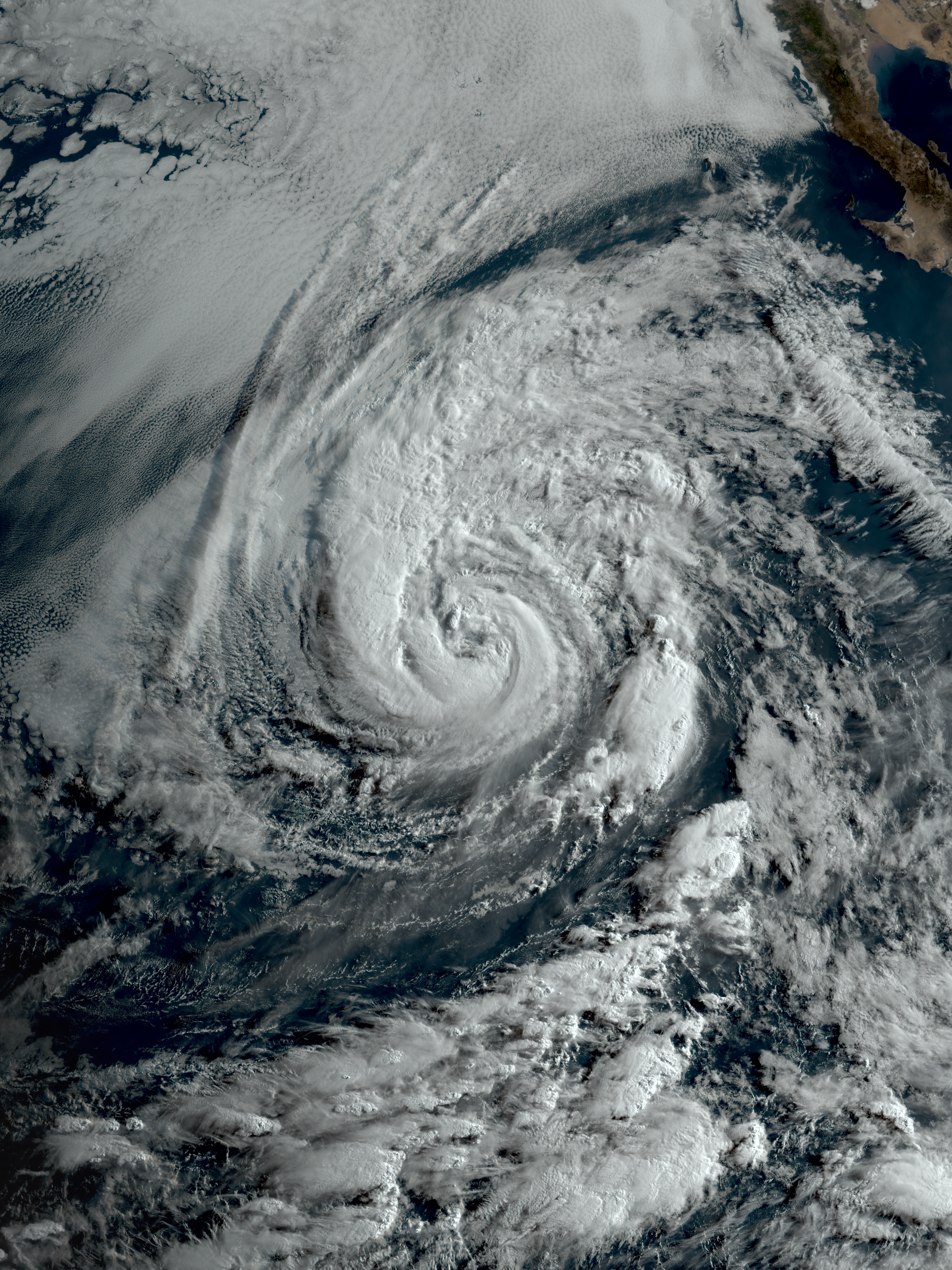
Tropical Storm Elida at peak intensity on July 18

- 09:00 UTC (2:00 a.m. PDT) at 18.0°N 122.8°W – Tropical Storm Elida attains its peak intensity, with maximum sustained winds of 70 mph (110 km/h) and a minimum central pressure of 990 mbar (29.23 inHg), while located about 900 mi (1,450 km) west-southwest of the southern tip of the Baja California peninsula.

July 19

- 03:00 UTC (8:00 p.m. MST, July 18) at 11.3°N 109.1°W – Tropical Depression Six-E develops from a low-pressure area while located about 805 mi (1,290 km) south of the southern tip of the Baja California peninsula.
- 21:00 UTC (2:00 p.m. MST) at 12.4°N 112.7°W – Tropical Depression Six-E strengthens into Tropical Storm Fausto while located about 750 mi (1,205 km) south-southwest of the southern tip of the Baja California peninsula.

July 20

- 15:00 UTC (8:00 a.m. PDT) at 26.4°N 127.2°W – Tropical Storm Elida transitions into a post-tropical cyclone while located about 1,110 mi (1,790 km) west-northwest of the southern tip of the Baja California peninsula.

July 21

- 03:00 UTC (8:00 p.m. PDT, July 20) at 14.7°N 117.3°W – Tropical Storm Fausto strengthens into a Category 1 hurricane on the Saffir–Simpson scale while located about 745 mi (1,200 km) southwest of the southern tip of the Baja California peninsula.

July 24

- 09:00 UTC (11:00 p.m. HST, July 23) at 18.5°N 129.9°W – Hurricane Fausto strengthens to Category 2 intensity while located about 1,325 mi (2,135 km) west of the southern tip of the Baja California peninsula.
- 15:00 UTC (5:00 a.m. HST) at 18.6°N 131.2°W – Hurricane Fausto attains its peak intensity, with maximum sustained winds of 105 mph (165 km/h) and a minimum central pressure of 967 mbar (28.56 inHg), while located about 1,405 mi (2,260 km) west of the southern tip of the Baja California peninsula.
- 15:00 UTC (9:00 a.m. CST) at 9.0°N 100.5°W – Tropical Depression Seven-E develops from a low-pressure area while located about 605 mi (975 km) south of Zihuatanejo, Guerrero.
- 21:00 UTC (3:00 p.m. CST) at 9.2°N 101.9°W – Tropical Depression Seven-E strengthens into Tropical Storm Genevieve while located about 585 mi (945 km) south of Zihuatanejo.

July 26

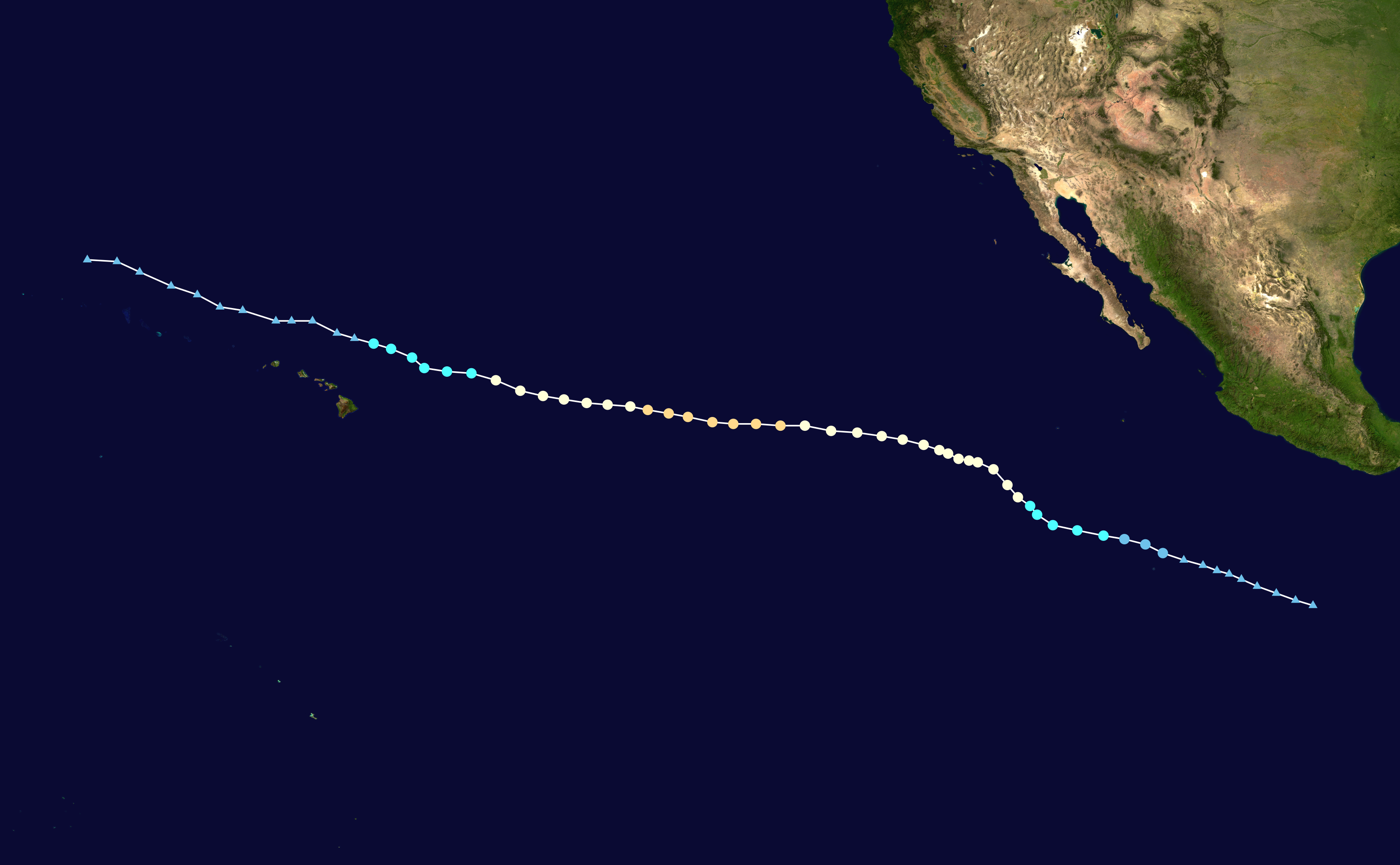
Storm track of Hurricane Fausto

- 03:00 UTC (8:00 p.m. MST, July 25) at 12.1°N 106.7°W – Tropical Storm Genevieve strengthens into a Category 1 hurricane while located about 500 mi (810 km) south-southwest of Manzanillo, Colima.
- 09:00 UTC (11:00 p.m. HST, July 25) at 19.7°N 139.8°W – Hurricane Fausto weakens to Category 1 intensity while located about 995 mi (1,600 km) east of Hilo, Hawaii.
- 15:00 UTC (5:00 a.m. HST) at 19.9°N 141.1°W – Hurricane Fausto crosses 140°W into the Central Pacific basin while located about 910 mi (1,465 km) east of Hilo.
- 15:00 UTC (8:00 a.m. MST) at 13.4°N 109.4°W – Hurricane Genevieve rapidly strengthens to Category 3 intensity while located about 515 mi (825 km) southwest of Manzanillo, making it the first major hurricane of the season.
- 21:00 UTC (2:00 p.m. MST) at 13.9°N 110.3°W – Hurricane Genevieve strengthens to Category 4 intensity while located about 530 mi (855 km) southwest of Manzanillo.

July 27

- 09:00 UTC (2:00 a.m. MST) at 15.5°N 112.2°W – Hurricane Genevieve strengthens to Category 5 intensity while located about 530 mi (855 km) south-southwest of the southern tip of the Baja California peninsula. It simultaneously attains its peak intensity, with maximum sustained winds of 160 mph (260 km/h) and a minimum central pressure of 925 mbar (27.32 inHg).
- 15:00 UTC (8:00 a.m. MST) at 16.0°N 113.1°W – Hurricane Genevieve weakens to Category 4 intensity while located about 520 mi (835 km) south-southwest of the southern tip of the Baja California peninsula.

July 28

Video of the eye of Hurricane Genevieve as seen from satellite on July 27

- 03:00 UTC (5:00 p.m. HST, July 27) at 21.7°N 149.0°W – Hurricane Fausto weakens into a tropical storm while located about 415 mi (670 km) east-northeast of Hilo.
- 15:00 UTC (8:00 a.m. PDT) at 17.9°N 116.1°W – Hurricane Genevieve weakens to Category 3 intensity while located about 530 mi (850 km) southwest of the southern tip of the Baja California peninsula.

July 29

- 00:00 UTC (5:00 p.m. PDT, July 28) at 18.2°N 117.2°W – Hurricane Genevieve restrengthens to Category 4 intensity while located about 575 mi (920 km) west-southwest of the southern tip of the Baja California peninsula.
- 09:00 UTC (11:00 p.m. HST, July 28) at 23.3°N 154.5°W – Tropical Storm Fausto weakens into a tropical depression while located about 250 mi (405 km) north of Hilo.
- 09:00 UTC (11:00 p.m. HST, July 28) at 18.4°N 118.4°W – Hurricane Genevieve again weakens to Category 3 intensity while located about 630 mi (1,015 km) west-southwest of the southern tip of the Baja California peninsula.
- 15:00 UTC (5:00 a.m. HST) at 23.8°N 155.6°W – Tropical Depression Fausto degenerates into a remnant low while located about 225 mi (365 km) northeast of Honolulu, Hawaii.
- 21:00 UTC (11:00 a.m. HST) at 19.2°N 120.1°W – Hurricane Genevieve weakens to Category 2 intensity while located about 705 mi (1,135 km) west-southwest of the southern tip of the Baja California peninsula.

July 30

- 09:00 UTC (11:00 p.m. HST, July 29) at 20.2°N 122.1°W – Hurricane Genevieve weakens to Category 1 intensity while located about 805 mi (1,295 km) west of the southern tip of the Baja California peninsula.

July 31

- 03:00 UTC (5:00 p.m. HST, July 30) at 21.3°N 126.0°W – Hurricane Genevieve weakens into a tropical storm while located about 1,035 mi (1,665 km) west of the southern tip of the Baja California peninsula.

=== August ===
August 2

- 21:00 UTC (11:00 a.m. HST) at 24.8°N 139.5°W – Tropical Storm Genevieve transitions into a post-tropical cyclone while located about 1,870 mi (3,010 km) west of the southern tip of the Baja California peninsula.

August 13

- 03:00 UTC (8:00 p.m. PDT, August 12) at 18.1°N 131.7°W – Tropical Depression Eight-E develops from a low-pressure area while located about 1,445 mi (2,330 km) west of the southern tip of the Baja California peninsula.
- 09:00 UTC (2:00 a.m. PDT) at 18.1°N 131.9°W – Tropical Depression Eight-E strengthens into Tropical Storm Hernan while located about 1,460 mi (2,350 km) west of the southern tip of the Baja California peninsula.
- 15:00 UTC (5:00 a.m. HST) at 15.2°N 145.5°W – Tropical Storm Lala develops from an area of unsettled weather while located about 705 mi (1,135 km) east-southeast of Hilo. (Note: Due to the threat the developing system posed to Hawaii, the Central Pacific Hurricane Center initiated advisories on it, designating it Potential Tropical Cyclone One-C at 15:00 UTC (5:00 a.m. HST) on August 12.)
- 21:00 UTC (2:00 p.m. PDT) at 17.3°N 131.9°W – Tropical Storm Hernan attains its peak intensity, with maximum sustained winds of 45 mph (75 km/h) and a minimum central pressure of 1003 mbar (29.62 inHg), while located about 1,475 mi (2,375 km) west of the southern tip of the Baja California peninsula.

August 14

- 21:00 UTC (11:00 a.m. HST) at 15.6°N 132.1°W – Tropical Storm Hernan weakens into a tropical depression while located about 1,530 mi (2,465 km) west-southwest of the southern tip of the Baja California peninsula.

August 15

- 19:00 UTC (9:00 a.m. HST) at 17.9°N 155.1°W – Tropical Storm Lala strengthens into a Category 1 hurricane while located about 85 mi (135 km) south-southeast of South Point, Hawaii.
- 21:00 UTC (11:00 a.m. HST) at 15.8°N 135.9°W – Tropical Depression Hernan degenerates into a remnant low while located about 1,760 mi (2,835 km) west of the southern tip of the Baja California peninsula.

August 16

- 12:00 UTC (2:00 a.m. HST) at 19.9°N 157.6°W – Hurricane Lala weakens into a tropical storm while located about 100 mi (160 km) south of Honolulu.

August 18

- 09:00 UTC (11:00 p.m. HST, August 17) at 20.4°N 166.1°W – Tropical Storm Lala restrengthens into a Category 1 hurricane while located about 440 mi (705 km) southeast of Maro Reef.
- 18:00 UTC (8:00 a.m. HST) at 20.4°N 167.7°W – Hurricane Lala strengthens to Category 2 intensity while located about 380 mi (615 km) south-southeast of Maro Reef.

August 19

- 02:00 UTC (4:00 p.m. HST, August 18) at 20.6°N 168.7°W – Hurricane Lala strengthens to Category 3 intensity while located about 345 mi (555 km) south-southeast of Maro Reef, making it the second major hurricane of the season.
- 09:00 UTC (11:00 p.m. HST, August 18) at 20.9°N 169.7°W – Hurricane Lala strengthens to Category 4 intensity while located about 310 mi (495 km) south of Maro Reef. It simultaneously attains its peak intensity, with maximum sustained winds of 130 mph (215 km/h) and a minimum central pressure of 947 mbar (27.96 inHg).
- 12:00 UTC (2:00 a.m. HST) at 21.0°N 169.9°W – Hurricane Lala weakens to Category 3 intensity while located about 300 mi (480 km) south of Maro Reef.

August 20

- 09:00 UTC (11:00 p.m. HST, August 19) at 23.5°N 171.9°W – Hurricane Lala weakens to Category 2 intensity while located about 150 mi (245 km) southwest of Maro Reef.
- 15:00 UTC (5:00 a.m. HST) at 11.9°N 143.1°W – Tropical Depression Two-C develops from an area of unsettled weather while located about 960 mi (1,545 km) east-southeast of Hilo.
- 21:00 UTC (11:00 a.m. HST) at 24.9°N 172.3°W – Hurricane Lala weakens to Category 1 intensity while located about 115 mi (185 km) west-southwest of Maro Reef.

August 21

- 09:00 UTC (11:00 p.m. HST, August 20) at 26.6°N 171.7°W – Hurricane Lala restrengthens to Category 2 intensity while located about 115 mi (190 km) northwest of Maro Reef.
- 21:00 UTC (11:00 a.m. HST) at 28.6°N 170.4°W – Hurricane Lala again weakens to Category 1 intensity while located about 230 mi (365 km) north of Maro Reef.
- 21:00 UTC (11:00 a.m. HST) at 13.9°N 147.2°W – Tropical Depression Two-C strengthens into Tropical Storm Moke while located about 660 mi (1,060 km) southeast of Hilo.

August 23

- 03:00 UTC (5:00 p.m. HST, August 22) at 31.5°N 172.9°W – Hurricane Lala weakens into a tropical storm while located about 325 mi (525 km) north-northeast of Pearl and Hermes Atoll and about 385 mi (625 km) northeast of Kure Atoll.
- 15:00 UTC (8:00 p.m. MST) at 15.3°N 114.2°W – Tropical Storm Iselle develops from an area of low pressure while located about 595 mi (995 km) south-southwest of the southern tip of Baja California.

August 24

- 21:00 UTC (11:00 a.m. HST) at 15.3°N 157.3°W – Tropical Storm Moke weakens into a tropical depression while located about 335 mi (540 km) south-southwest of Hilo.
- 21:00 UTC (2:00 p.m. MST) at 19.2°N 118.0°W – Tropical Storm Iselle attains its peak intensity, with maximum sustained winds of 70 mph (110 km/h) and a minimum central pressure of 988 mbar (29.18 inHg) while located about 580 mi (935 km) west-southwest of the southern tip of Baja California.
- 21:00 UTC (2:00 p.m. PDT) at 13.5°N 120.8°W – Tropical Depression Ten-E forms from a small area of low pressure while located about 965 mi (1555 km) southwest of the southern tip of Baja California.

August 25

- 09:00 UTC (11:00 p.m. HST, August 24) at 16.3°N 164.1°W – Tropical Depression Moke degenerates into a remnant low while located about 360 mi (575 km) east of Johnston Island.
- 09:00 UTC (2:00 a.m. PDT) at 17.5°N 119.8°W – Tropical Depression Ten-E strengthens into Tropical Storm Julio while located about 815 mi (1310 km) southwest of the southern tip of Baja California.
- 15:00 UTC (8:00 a.m. PDT) at 18.0°N 118.9°W – Tropical Storm Julio attains its peak intensity, with maximum sustained winds of 50 mph (75 km/h) and a minimum central pressure of 1,001 mbar (29.56 inHg) while located about 675 (1085 km) west-southwest of the southern tip of Baja California.
- 21:00 UTC (2:00 p.m. PDT) at 21.0°N 119.5°W – Tropical Storm Julio dissapates while located about 630 mi (1010 km) west of the southern tip of Baja California.

August 27

- 03:00 UTC (8:00 p.m. PDT, August 26) at 23.0°N 125.9°W – Tropical Storm Iselle transitions into a post-tropical cyclone while located about 1050 mi (1635 km) west of the southern tip of Baja California.
- 21:00 UTC (2:00 p.m. MST) at 11.1°N 111.9°W – Tropical Storm Karina forms from an area of low pressure while loacted about 825 mi (1330 km) south of the southern tip of Baja California.
- 21:00 UTC (11:00 a.m. HST) at 11.3°N 133.8°W – Tropical Storm Lowell forms from an area of low pressure while located 1765 mi (2840 km) west-southwest of the southern tip of Baja California.

August 28

- 09:00 UTC (11:00 p.m. HST, August 27) at 38.2°N 179.4°W – Tropical Storm Lala transitions into a post-tropical cyclone while located about 680 mi (1,095 km) north of Kure Atoll.

August 30

- 09:00 UTC (2:00 a.m. PDT) at 17.3°N 121.1°W – Tropical Storm Karina strengthens into a Category 1 Hurricane while located about 820 mi (1325 km) west-southwest of the southern tip of Baja California.

August 31

- 00:00 UTC (5:00 p.m. PDT, August 30) at 17.2°N 123.4°W – Hurricane Karina rapidly strengthens to Category 3 intensity while located about 960 mi (1545 km) west-southwest of the southern tip of Baja California.
- 09:00 UTC (11:00 p.m HST, August 30) at 17.2°N 124.4°W – Hurricane Karina strengthens to Category 4 intensity while located about 1020 mi (1640 km) west-southwest of the southern tip of Baja California.

=== September ===
September 1

- 09:00 UTC (2:00 a.m. MST) at 13.8°N 108.9°W – Tropical Storm Marie forms from an area of low pressure located about 470 mi (760 km) southwest of Manzanillo, Colima, Mexico.
- 15:00 UTC (5:00 a.m HST) at 13.4°N 149.4°W – Tropical Storm Lowell strengthens into a Category 1 Hurricane while located about 575 mi (925 km) southeast of Hilo, Hawaii.

September 2

- 00:00 UTC (2:00 p.m. HST, September 1) at 13.5°N 150.7°W – Hurricane Lowell rapidly strengthens to Category 3 intensity while located about 520 mi (835 km) southeast of Hilo, Hawaii.
- 03:00 UTC (5:00 p.m. HST, September 1) at 13.5°N 151.2°W – Hurricane Lowell strengthens to Category 4 intensity while located about 500 mi (805 km) south-southeast of Hilo, Hawaii.
- 09:00 UTC (11:00 p.m. HST, September 1) at 13.5°N 151.2°W – Hurricane Karina attains its peak intensity, with maximum sustained winds of 145 mph (230 km/h) and a minimum central pressure of 940 mbar (27.76 inHg) while located about 1440 mi (2315 km) west-southwest of the southern tip of Baja California.
- 21:00 UTC (11:00 a.m. HST) at 13.3°N 154.3°W – Hurricane Lowell strengthens to Category 5 intensity while located about 445 mi (715 km) south of Hilo, Hawaii.

September 3

- 03:00 UTC (8:00 p.m. MST, September 2) at 18.4°N 113.1°W – Tropical Storm Marie strengthens into a Category 1 Hurricane while located about 375 mi (600 km) southwest of the southern tip of Baja California.
- 03:00 UTC (5:00 p.m. HST, September 2) at 13.3°N 155.2°W – Hurricane Lowell weakens to Category 4 intensity while located about 440 mi (710 km) south of Hilo, Hawaii.
- 09:00 UTC (11:00 p.m. HST, September 2) at 19.6°N 135.7°W – Hurricane Karina weakens to Category 3 intensity while located about 1260 mi (2030 km) east of Hilo, Hawaii.
- 21:00 UTC (11:00 a.m. HST at 19.8°N 137.6°W – Hurricane Karina weakens to Category 2 intensity while located about 1135 mi (1830 km) east of Hilo, Hawaii.

=== November ===
November 30

- The 2026 Pacific hurricane season officially ends.

== See also ==
- Tropical cyclones in 2026
