= Hurricane Nolo =

Category 4 Pacific hurricane and typhoon in 2026

- Nolo at peak intensity southwest of Hawaii on September 28 while displaying annular characteristics

Meteorological history
- Formed: September 13, 2026
- Remnant low: October 11, 2026
- Dissipated: October 14, 2026
- Duration: 4 weeks and 3 days (Note: 2 weeks and 2 days while it was tropical in the Eastern, Central, and Western Pacific)

Category 4 major hurricane
- 1-minute sustained (SSHWS/NWS)
- Highest winds: 155 mph (250 km/h)
- Lowest pressure: 929 mbar (hPa); 27.43 inHg

Overall effects
- Fatalities: None
- Damage: Unknown
- Areas affected: Hawaiian Islands
- Part of the 2026 Pacific hurricane and typhoon seasons

Hurricane Nolo, also known as Typhoon Nolo, was a powerful and extremely long-lived tropical cyclone that became the fifth-wettest on record to affect the U.S. state of Hawaii. It was the nineteenth named storm, ninth hurricane, and fifth major hurricane of the 2026 Pacific hurricane season, as well as the eleventh typhoon of the 2026 Pacific typhoon season.

Nolo originated from an area of disturbed weather monitored by the National Hurricane Center (NHC) south of the Baja California Peninsula on September 8. The system developed a broad area of low pressure and became better organized, developing into Tropical Depression Fifteen-E on September 13. Increasing wind shear caused the depression to degenerate into a trough on September 16, but its remnants regenerated into a tropical depression in the central Pacific on September 23. The system strengthened into a tropical storm later that day. Nolo became a Category 1 hurricane on September 25 and strengthened to Category 2 later that day. Dry air caused it to weaken to Category 1 strength on September 26, before restrengthening to Category 2 strength on September 27. On September 28, Nolo became an annular hurricane and rapidly intensified into a Category 4 hurricane, reaching peak winds of 155 mph (250 km/h) and a minimum pressure of 929 mbar (27.43 inHg).

Strong southwesterly wind shear and dry mid-level air subsequently caused Nolo to weaken rapidly to a tropical storm on September 30. Nolo began reorganizing on October 2 as environmental conditions became more favorable and restrengthened into a Category 1 hurricane. The following day, it rapidly intensified to Category 2 and then Category 3 strength as deep convection became better organized around a warm eye. Nolo crossed the International Date Line at 180°W, and NHC issued its final advisory at 21:00 UTC on October 4 as the system became Typhoon Nolo. Responsibility subsequently passed to the Japan Meteorological Agency (JMA) on October 5. On October 7, the JMA reported that Nolo had weakened into a severe tropical storm, while the JTWC assessed it as having weakened to tropical storm-equivalent strength. By October 9, the JMA had further downgraded Nolo to a tropical storm as it struggled to maintain its intensity. Satellite imagery showed the near-complete dissipation of deep convection amid strong easterly vertical wind shear. Nolo's low-level circulation centre became increasingly exposed and elongated as the storm moved over cooler waters, with fragmented, shallow convection persisting around its centre. On October 11, the JMA downgraded Nolo to a tropical depression as it moved slowly northward along the western side of a mid-level subtropical high. Strong wind shear and dry air continued to weaken the system, and the JMA reported that Nolo had dissipated later that day, southeast of Japan.

Although Hurricane Nolo caused no significant damage in Hawaii, it brought minor flooding and caused minimal damage as it passed nearby. No direct or indirect fatalities were reported. Nolo was the fourth tropical cyclone to affect Hawaii in 2026, following Hurricanes Lala and Lowell and Tropical Storm Moke. A hurricane watch and a tropical storm warning were issued for Hawaiʻi County, while several roads were closed because of flooding and landslides.

== Meteorological history ==
Map plotting the storm's track and intensity, according to the Saffir–Simpson scale Map key Saffir–Simpson scale Tropical depression (≤38 mph, ≤62 km/h) Tropical storm (39–73 mph, 63–118 km/h) Category 1 (74–95 mph, 119–153 km/h) Category 2 (96–110 mph, 154–177 km/h) Category 3 (111–129 mph, 178–208 km/h) Category 4 (130–156 mph, 209–251 km/h) Category 5 (≥157 mph, ≥252 km/h) Unknown Storm type Tropical cyclone Subtropical cyclone Extratropical cyclone, remnant low, tropical disturbance, or monsoon depression

=== Origin and regeneration ===
On September 8, the National Hurricane Center (NHC) (Note: The National Hurricane Center is the Regional Specialized Meteorological Center for the northeast Pacific Ocean from the coast of Central America west until 140°W.) began monitoring an area of interest well south of the Baja California Peninsula, noting that some slow development was possible as the system moved generally west-northwestward, although the NHC noted that the system would likely develop into a tropical depression within the next week. On the next day, a broad area of low pressure developed, with showers and thunderstorms associated with the system located several hundred miles southwest of the southwestern coast of Mexico. On September 11, the system became better organized in association with a broad area of low pressure.

Tropical Depression Fifteen-E shortly after formation on September 13

On September 13 at 21:00 UTC, (Note: All times are in Coordinated Universal Time, unless otherwise noted) the consolidating low formed into Tropical Depression Fifteen-E. Unfavorable wind shear eventually overtook the tropical depression, causing it to open up into a trough early on September 16. Initially, the system was deemed to have a very low chance at regeneration and was not tracked. However, the next day, the NHC reintroduced the remnants into its tropical weather outlook when its convective activity increased, although it was noted that environmental conditions were only marginally conducive to some development as the system moved gradually westward. Despite this, the system began to reorganize as it continued into the central Pacific. Early on September 23, the system redeveloped into a tropical depression south of the Big Island of Hawaii. As the remnants remained trackable for more than a week after losing tropical cyclone status, NHC re-initiated advisories and retained its original designation as Tropical Depression Fifteen-E. Later that day, it strengthened into a tropical storm and was assigned the name Nolo by NHC, with the name being a Hawaiian word meaning "filled full" or "crowded".

=== Intensification and peak intensity ===
Hurricane Nolo at its initial peak intensity south of Hawaii on September 25

At 03:00 UTC on September 25, Nolo strengthened into a Category 1 hurricane on the Saffir–Simpson scale as it moved north-northwestward. It continued steadily strengthening, becoming a Category 2 hurricane late that day. Dry air intrusions caused Nolo to weaken back into a Category 1 hurricane on September 26 as it passed south of Hawaii's Big Island, moving westward. It restrengthened into a high-end Category 2 hurricane on September 27, continuing westward as its eye became better defined. By 09:00 UTC on September 28, Nolo had become an annular hurricane and rapidly intensified to Category 4 strength as a ridge began steering it west-northwestward, peaking with 1-minute sustained winds of 155 mph (250 km/h) and a barometric pressure of 929 mbar (27.43 inHg). After peaking, Nolo began to weaken as increasing westerly wind shear affected the hurricane, with satellite imagery indicating more asymmetric convection, as convection decreased north and east of the well-defined, very warm eye while increasing to the south and west.

The hurricane turned toward the northwest as it moved along the southwestern and western periphery of a mid-level high centered north of the main Hawaiian Islands. Nolo remained a major hurricane (Note: A major hurricane is one that ranks at Category 3 or higher on the Saffir–Simpson scale.) despite moderate to strong vertical wind shear caused by an approaching mid- to upper-level trough to its northwest, eventually weakening to a Category 2 hurricane the following day as its convective organization continued to deteriorate. The hurricane continued to weaken due to strong southwesterly vertical wind shear and dry air entrainment, with satellite imagery showing the low-level center becoming partially exposed as deep convection decreased in coverage and cloud tops warmed, eventually weakening to a Category 1 hurricane while slowing and turning northward.

=== Weakening and restrengthening ===
On September 30, Nolo continued to rapidly weaken under strong southwesterly vertical wind shear and dry mid-level air, eventually weakening to tropical storm status as its low-level circulation became completely exposed, with only minimal convection persisting northeast of the center, while the storm drifted slightly south of west. The storm's structure continued to degrade, with the defined center becoming less distinct and convection across the southern flank weakening substantially based on satellite imagery. Nolo's convection continued to dissipate, with satellite imagery showing warming cloud-top temperatures in the remnant convection northwest of the low-level circulation, while dry air persisted across the storm's southern semicircle.

Hurricanes Nolo (left), Odalys (center), and Polo (center-right), with the disturbances that later became Rachel (far right) and Nineteen-E (southeast of Nolo) on September 25

On October 1, the storm showed signs of improvement as it gradually became better organized, with satellite imagery showing bursts of deep convection and some outflow in the northwestern quadrant, the redevelopment of moderate to deep convection near the center, and a large spiral band forming in the eastern semicircle, although conventional satellite estimates remained barely at tropical-storm strength as the storm passed south of French Frigate Shoals within the Papahānaumokuākea Marine National Monument. By 03:00 UTC on October 2, Nolo began to become better organized as it moved into a more favorable environment, although its structure remained poorly defined around the center, with drier air still prevailing. Another burst of deep convection developed in the northwestern quadrant, while the southern semicircle remained relatively free of activity and convection became more persistent near the center of circulation.

The storm's convective structure continued to improve, with an eye becoming apparent in satellite imagery as the storm reached near-hurricane strength. At 21:00 UTC, Nolo restrengthened into a Category 1 hurricane as its structure began to improve, while it moved slowly westward under the influence of weak ridging to the north. The hurricane's convective organization continued to improve, with satellite imagery showing deep convection expanding around a warming eye over the past several hours. The next day, the hurricane rapidly re-intensified, with cold cloud tops associated with deep convection expanding symmetrically around a very warm eye as it strengthened into a Category 2 hurricane before rapidly intensifying further into a Category 3 hurricane. On October 4, NHC noted that Nolo's eye and inner core had degraded due to an eyewall replacement cycle, while the hurricane continued to move quickly westward under the influence of an expanding mid-level ridge to its north. Nolo subsequently appeared to have completed the eyewall replacement cycle, and its satellite presentation steadily improved. The eyewall re-consolidated, with a symmetric ring of deep convection completely wrapping around the center, while the eye cleared significantly and transitioned from a ragged appearance to a distinct, circular, and warming eye, with temperatures near 15 °C (59 °F).

=== Becoming a typhoon and dissipation ===
Hurricane Nolo transitioning into a typhoon after crossing the International Date Line on October 5

While Nolo crossed the International Date Line, NHC issued its final advisory on the hurricane at 21:00 UTC on October 4 as it became Typhoon Nolo, marking the first such occurrence since Hurricane Dora in 2023. Responsibility for the storm subsequently passed to the Japan Meteorological Agency (JMA) (Note: The Japan Meteorological Agency is the official Regional Specialized Meteorological Center for the western Pacific Ocean.) at 00:00 UTC on October 5, after which the Joint Typhoon Warning Center (JTWC) (Note: While not designated by the World Meteorological Organization as a Regional Specialized Meteorological Center, the Joint Typhoon Warning Center issues warnings on tropical cyclones in all of the major tropical cyclone basins to supplement the activities of United States government agencies.) issued advisories for the system and redesignated it as 15E at 03:00 UTC the same day. With one-minute sustained winds of 195 km/h (120 mph), Nolo was a Category 3-equivalent typhoon on the Saffir–Simpson wind scale, according to the JTWC. At the time, the JMA assessed the typhoon's maximum 10-minute sustained winds at 165 km/h (105 mph) and its central atmospheric pressure at 960 hPa (28.35 inHg), before reporting at 03:00 UTC that its intensity had increased to maximum sustained winds of 175 km/h (110 mph) and a central atmospheric pressure of 950 hPa (28.05 inHg).

Satellite imagery depicted the typhoon with a ragged, partially cloud-filled eye with a temperature of 16 °C (61 °F), surrounded by a thick, nearly symmetrical convective ring that maintained cloud-top temperatures of −60 °C (−76 °F). The typhoon continued to develop outer rainbands around its eastern and southern flanks while maintaining a symmetrical eye surrounded by well-organized spiral bands of deep convection and a central dense overcast (CDO). The typhoon was moving west-northwestward along the southwestern periphery of a mid-level subtropical high, with good cloud characteristics and anticyclonic outflow, while satellite imagery showed a large, symmetrical eye, slightly warming cloud tops as dry air entered the western side of the core, and storm- and typhoon-force winds concentrated along the southwestern semicircle with stronger winds extending across the northeastern semicircle. Nolo developed curved banding wrapping around a 24.2 miles (38.9 km) diameter eye, with warming cloud tops and a gradual degradation of its symmetric structure as the system moved west-northwestward along the southern periphery of a mid-level subtropical high under increasing northwesterly vertical wind shear.

Tropical Storm Nolo weakening on October 10, with Typhoon Koguma visible to its southeast

On October 6, Nolo exhibited a well-defined eye, with improving symmetry of its compact CDO, cooling convective cloud tops, and fairly symmetrical spiral bands of deep convection; however, the typhoon's eye subsequently underwent a sudden and dramatic collapse as its poleward outflow channel was completely suppressed by moderate to high northerly vertical wind shear. At 21:00 UTC that day, the JTWC reported that Nolo had weakened to minimal typhoon-equivalent strength as it rapidly deteriorated under strong northeasterly wind shear. Nolo continued moving rapidly westward along the steep pressure gradient south of the expansive subtropical ridge, while remaining over the low-level circulation center as its structure continued to deteriorate, with satellite imagery showing significant degradation of the CDO, which had become increasingly asymmetric and elongated and lacked spiral banding.

On October 7, the JMA reported that Nolo had weakened into a severe tropical storm, while the JTWC reported that it had weakened to tropical storm-equivalent strength, as the storm continued to exhibit an asymmetric CDO obscuring the low-level circulation centre, with fluctuating deep convection as it struggled against strong easterly vertical wind shear. Nolo's convective structure became increasingly disorganized, with warming cloud tops and deep convection displaced to the west of the low-level circulation center as dry air moved from the north along its western periphery while the storm moved west-northwestward along the southwestern periphery of a mid-level subtropical high. At 06:00 UTC on October 9, the JMA reported that Nolo had weakened further into a tropical storm as it struggled to maintain its intensity, with satellite imagery showing the near-complete dissipation of deep convection despite a tightly wrapped mid-level circulation, scattered areas of deep convection over a well-defined low-level circulation, and stratocumulus cloud lines to the west suggesting that dry air was affecting the system. Nolo's low-level circulation center became increasingly exposed and elongated as the storm moved over cooler waters, with fragmented, shallow convection around its center. As the upper-level convection weakened, Nolo became a shallow, poorly defined system with its center obscured by a persistent plume of weakly organized convection. At 15:00 UTC on October 10, the JTWC issued its final warning on Nolo, noting that the storm had weakened rapidly into a shallow system. At 06:00 UTC on October 11, the JMA downgraded Nolo to a tropical depression as it moved slowly northward along the western side of a mid-level subtropical high, while strong wind shear and dry air continued to weaken the storm. Later that day, at 15:00 UTC, the JTWC reclassified the system as a subtropical depression, with satellite imagery showing a poorly organised low-level circulation centre and convection flaring up to the northeast. At 18:00 UTC, the JMA reported that the system had dissipated, and the JTWC followed suit the following day at 03:00 UTC.

== Preparations ==
Hurricane Nolo passed south of the Big Island on September 26

A hurricane watch was issued late on September 23 for Hawaiʻi County in anticipation of Nolo's impacts. This was followed by a tropical storm warning the next day. Governor Josh Green declared a state of emergency for the state. Green announced that state and county offices, Hawaiʻi State public schools, and University of Hawaiʻi campuses and facilities on Hawaiʻi Island would close from September 24 to 25 due to potential impacts from Nolo, while a pre-landfall Presidential Emergency Declaration for Hawaiʻi was approved to provide federal aid for protective measures in response to Hurricane Nolo on Oʻahu and in the counties of Hawaiʻi, Maui, and Kauaʻi. United States President Donald Trump approved a federal disaster declaration for Hawaii as a result of Nolo and several other hurricane impacts on the state. The state also provided hotel rooms for some in affected areas to evacuate to. Hawaiʻi County schools and offices closed. Both Haleakalā National Park and Hawaiʻi Volcanoes National Park closed in advance of the hurricane. The Hawaii Department of Land and Natural Resources reported that all state parks on Hawaiʻi Island and Maui were closed because of the storm, while Hawaiian Electric Industries warned customers across the state to prepare for possible power outages as Hurricane Nolo approached the islands.

On September 23, the Federal Emergency Management Agency (FEMA) authorized federal disaster assistance for Hawaii to support local response efforts following the emergency conditions caused by Nolo. On September 25, FEMA deployed several emergency response resources to Hawaii in response to the storm, including urban search and rescue teams from San Diego and Colorado, a federal team specializing in complex search operations, and a mobile unit to support emergency communications. That same day, Team Rubicon began deploying disaster relief volunteers to Hawaiʻi Island to conduct pre-landfall chainsaw operations, remove debris, clear access routes, and assess conditions on the ground. On September 25, Direct Relief began rushing urgently needed medical aid to Hawaii to help local healthcare providers maintain care as Hurricane Nolo approached. A hurricane watch was issued for portions of the Papahānaumokuākea Marine National Monument, followed by a hurricane warning as the storm intensified. Members of the Hawaii National Guard were mobilized across the state in preparation for Hurricane Nolo, with personnel, specialized vehicles, and emergency response capabilities pre-positioned on Oʻahu, Hawaiʻi Island, Maui, and Kauaʻi. Hawaiian Airlines and Southwest Airlines cancelled at least 21 flights to and from Hilo International Airport as Hurricane Nolo remained roughly south-southeast of the Big Island. The southern and southeastern shorelines of the Big Island were under a high surf warning as Hurricane Nolo generated a swell that produced large waves.

== Impact and aftermath ==
Wettest tropical cyclones and their remnants in Hawaii Highest-known totals
Precipitation			Storm	Location	Ref.
Rank	mm	in	Storm	Location	Ref.
1	1473	58.00	Lane 2018	Kahūnā Falls, Hawaii	
2	1321	52.00	Hiki 1950	Kanalohuluhulu Ranger Station	
3	1106	43.54	Lala 2026	Laupāhoehoe	
4	985	38.76	Paul 2000	Kapapala Ranch 36	
5	935	36.83	Nolo 2026	Mount Waiʻaleʻale	
6	635	25.00	Maggie 1970	Various stations	
7	536	21.11	Lowell 2026	Kilohana	
8	519	20.42	Nina 1957	Wainiha	
9	516	20.33	Iwa 1982	Intake Wainiha 1086	
10	476	18.75	Fabio 1988	Papaikou Mauka 140.1	

Large waves from Nolo hitting the coast of Waikiki, Hawaii on September 25

Hurricane Nolo brought minor flooding and minimal damage to Hawaii as it passed nearby. Nolo became the fourth tropical cyclone to affect Hawaii in 2026, following Hurricanes Lala and Lowell and Tropical Storm Moke.

Flooding caused by Nolo's heavy rainfall forced the closure of Kohala Mountain Road. Spencer Beach Park recorded 17.25 in (438 mm) of rainfall, while the USGS station on Mount Waiʻaleʻale recorded a storm-total accumulation of 36.83 in (935 mm) of rain. Over 16,000 people lost power in Hawaii as Nolo approached. Roads in North Kohala and ʻŌʻōkala were closed due to flooding and landslides. Gulches created by flooding from Hurricane Lala were filled by rainfall from Nolo, flooding Route 11 and several other roads in Kaʻū. A maximum wind gust of 88 mph (142 km/h) was recorded in Olowalu. At least 12,370 people in West Maui and Upcountry were reported without power due to strong winds from Hurricane Nolo. On the Big Island of Hawaii, power outages left about 700 people in the Kaʻū and Hāmākua districts, 1,100 in Kohala, 30 in Lower Puna, and 830 in Kahuku without electricity. On Oʻahu, about 200 people in ʻEwa were also left without electricity.

Rain from Nolo sent floodwaters and debris through parts of Kaʻū on Hawaii Island, including the same communities previously affected by Lala. In Waiʻōhinu, heavy rain sent water rushing through the streets, leaving roads, homes, and buildings covered in mud and debris. The Hōlei Sea Arch at Hawaiʻi Volcanoes National Park collapsed during the passage of Nolo following weathering from previous storms and volcanic eruptions. Hawaii National Guard crews rescued 19 people from floods. Meanwhile, about 120 soldiers and airmen assigned to Task Force Hawaii assisted local authorities, including six teams equipped with high-water vehicles. The hurricane produced large waves that affected the southern shores of the Big Island. In West Maui, strong winds from Nolo fueled a brush fire that burned more than 100 acres (40 ha) in Olowalu, prompting the evacuation of Olowalu Village and the closure of Honoapiʻilani Highway. Several towns on the Big Island were placed under water restrictions following Hurricane Nolo.

== See also ==
- Weather of 2026
- Tropical cyclones in 2026
- Timeline of the 2026 Pacific hurricane season
- List of Category 4 Pacific hurricanes
- List of very strong typhoons
- List of Hawaii hurricanes
- Hurricane Genevieve (2014) – the first tropical cyclone to track across all three northern Pacific basins since Hurricane Dora in 1999.
- Hurricane Kilo (2015) – approached the Hawaiian Islands from the southwest before turning sharply away from the islands.
- Hurricane Lane (2018) – approached the Hawaiian Islands from the southeast before curving westward and passing south of the islands.
- Hurricane Olivia (2018) – approached the Hawaiian Islands from the east before weakening and made landfall in Maui and Lanai.
