= Hurricane Lowell =

Category 5 Pacific hurricane in 2026

- Lowell at its second peak intensity south of Hawaii on September 5

Meteorological history
- Formed: August 27, 2026
- Post-tropical: September 11, 2026
- Dissipated: September 14, 2026

Category 5 major hurricane
- 1-minute sustained (SSHWS/NWS)
- Highest winds: 160 mph (260 km/h)
- Lowest pressure: 922 mbar (hPa); 27.23 inHg

Overall effects
- Fatalities: 3 direct
- Damage: >$400 million (2026 USD)
- Areas affected: Hawaiian Islands
- Part of the 2026 Pacific hurricane season

Hurricane Lowell was a long-lived and very powerful tropical cyclone that impacted the western Hawaiian Islands, making a direct hit on Ni'ihau and Kauaʻi. Lowell was the first hurricane to directly hit the island of Kauaʻi since Hurricane Iniki in 1992. (Note: The National Hurricane Center officially defines a direct hit as, for locations on the right-hand side of the track, when the cyclone passes within a distance equal to twice the radius of maximum wind.) The fourteenth named storm, fifth hurricane, fourth major hurricane, and second Category 5 hurricane of the 2026 Pacific hurricane season, Lowell formed on August 27 and reached Category 5 intensity on September 2. In doing so, it became the first Category 5 hurricane in the Central Pacific basin since Hurricane Walaka in 2018. Increasing wind shear and eyewall replacement cycles caused it to weaken to Category 3 status by September 4, but the following day, it rapidly intensified to Category 5 intensity once again. Increasing wind shear caused it to weaken to a Category 2 hurricane by the time it made its direct hit on Kaua'i County, and Lowell became post-tropical by September 11.

Lowell's powerful winds damaged structures and knocked out power for most Kaua'i County customers. Overall, the storm caused at least $400 million of damage in Hawai'i and killed at least three.

== Meteorological history ==
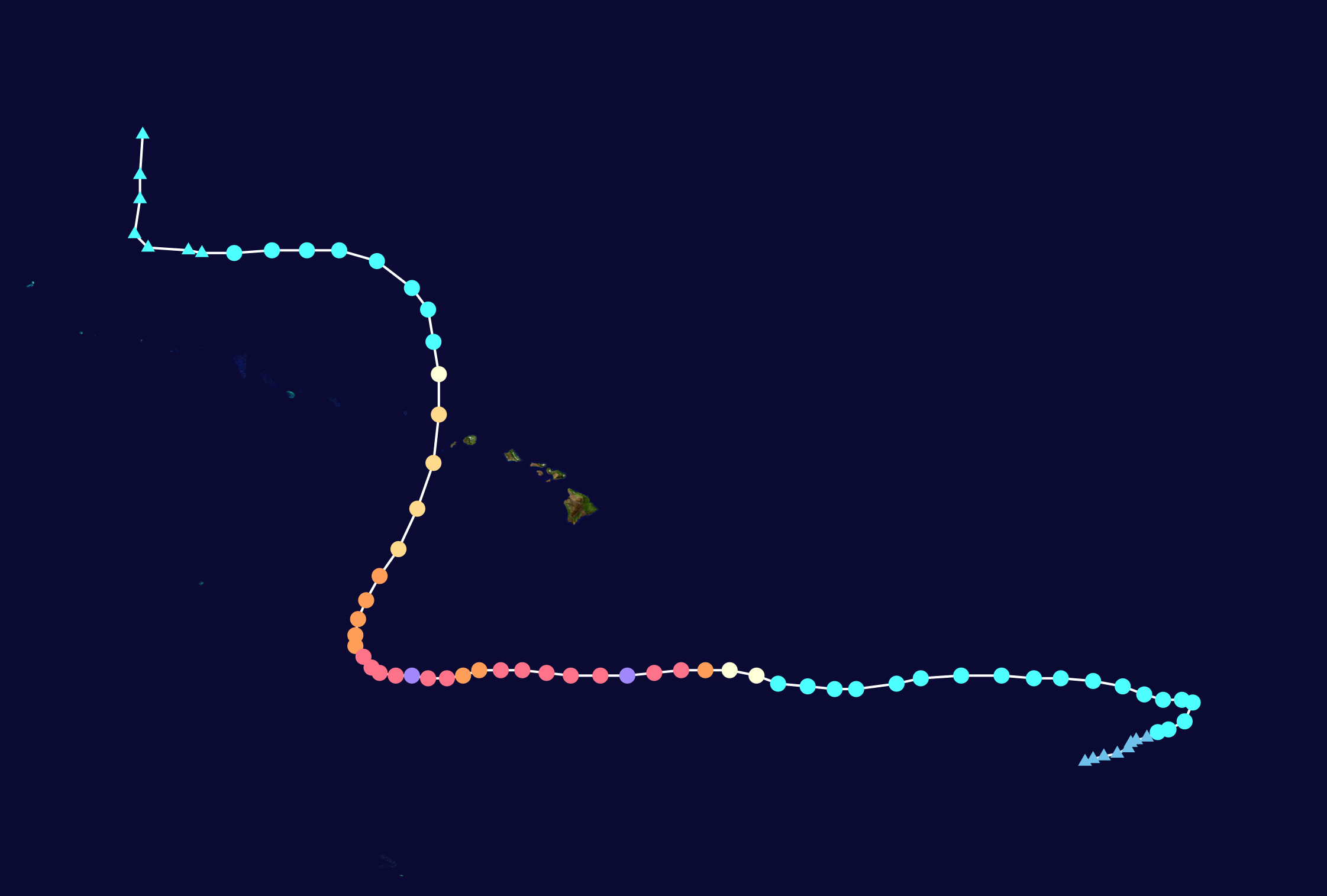
Map plotting the storm's track and intensity, according to the Saffir–Simpson scale Map key Saffir–Simpson scale Tropical depression (≤38 mph, ≤62 km/h) Tropical storm (39–73 mph, 63–118 km/h) Category 1 (74–95 mph, 119–153 km/h) Category 2 (96–110 mph, 154–177 km/h) Category 3 (111–129 mph, 178–208 km/h) Category 4 (130–156 mph, 209–251 km/h) Category 5 (≥157 mph, ≥252 km/h) Unknown Storm type Tropical cyclone Subtropical cyclone Extratropical cyclone, remnant low, tropical disturbance, or monsoon depression

On August 24, the National Hurricane Center (NHC) first noted a low potential for eventual tropical cyclogenesis, related to a trough located east-southeast of Hawaii. The weather system produced thunderstorms as it drifted northeastward across the eastern Pacific Ocean. By August 25, the NHC assessed a high likelihood – 70% – for a tropical cyclone to form. That day, a weak and small low-pressure area developed within the system. On August 26, the low became more organized due to favorable environmental conditions. Late on August 27, the NHC classified the system as Tropical Storm Lowell about 1,530 miles (2,460 km) east-southeast of Hawaii. The storm had a closed circulation, producing winds of 40 mph (65 km/h) alongside well-organized bands of convection.

Upon its formation, Lowell was moving to the east-northeast over an area of warm ocean temperatures. The storm gradually strengthened amid some northeasterly wind shear. Lowell's circulation became exposed from the thunderstorms, and the storm became disorganized. Late on August 28, Lowell turned to the west, steered by a ridge to its north. Around that time, the NHC noted uncertainty in the storm's future, due to potential interaction with Tropical Storm Karina to its east. On August 29, thunderstorms reformed over the circulation, although it continued to be affected by wind shear through the next day. On August 31, the convection became better organized after the wind shear decreased. By that time, the NHC anticipated that Lowell would undergo rapid intensification. On September 1, Lowell attained hurricane status about 575 miles (925 km) to the southeast of Hilo, Hawaii.

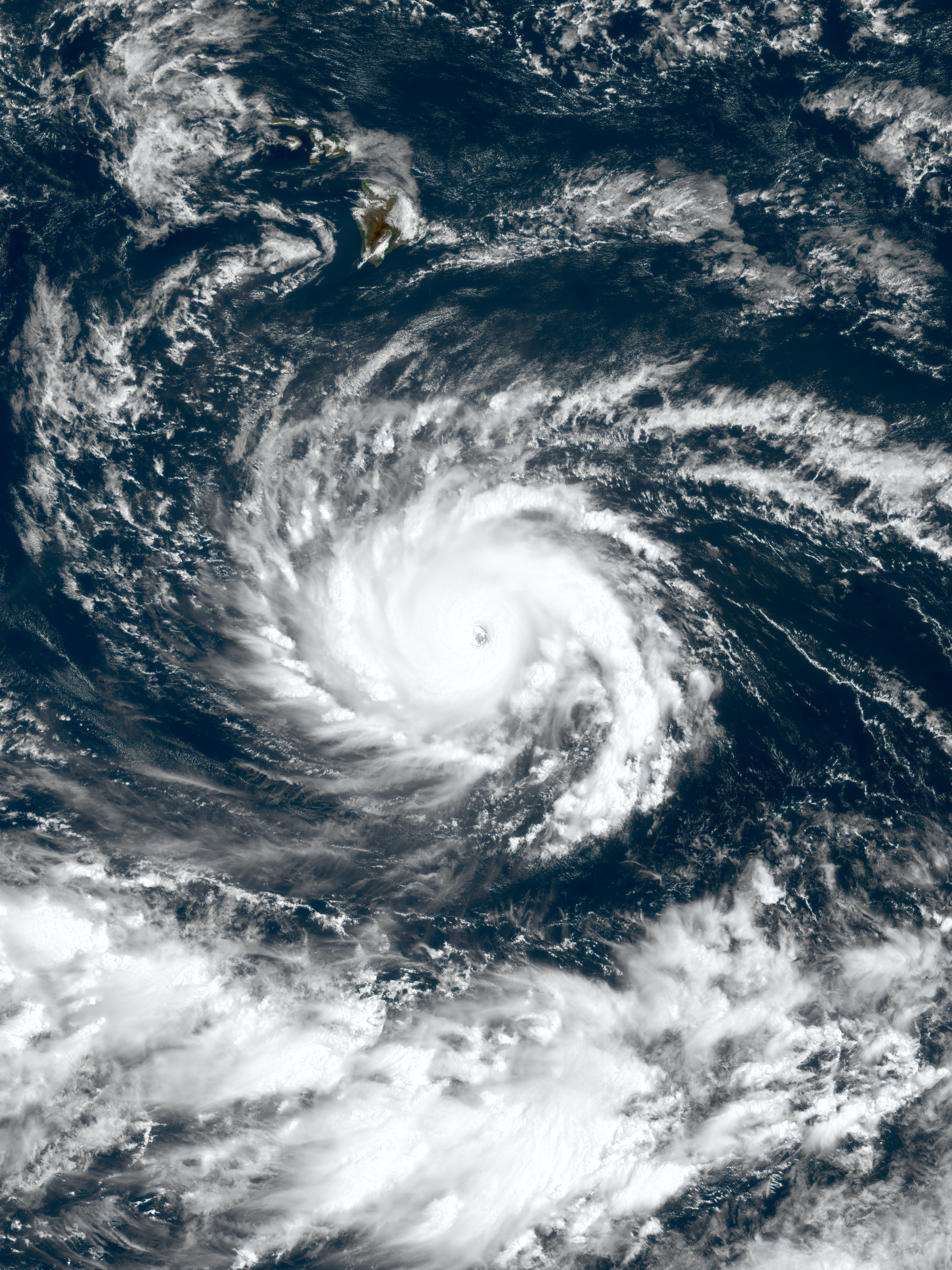
Lowell at its initial peak intensity south-southeast of the Hawaiian Islands on September 2

Late on September 1, Lowell intensified into a major hurricane, or a Category 3 on the Saffir-Simpson scale. The hurricane had an eye surrounded by a ring of deep convection. Late on September 2, Lowell strengthened further into a Category 5 hurricane, with maximum sustained winds of 160 mph (260 km/h) and a minimum pressure of 927 mbar (27.4 inHg). Around that time, it was located about 445 mi (715 km) south of Hilo. Lowell became the first Category 5 hurricane in the Central Pacific since Hurricane Walaka in 2018. After reaching peak intensity, Lowell weakened due to a combination of increased wind shear, dry air, and an eyewall replacement cycle. On September 4, it briefly fell to Category 3 intensity due to another replacement cycle. Later that day, the Hurricane Hunters observed that Lowell re-intensified into a high-end Category 4 hurricane as the eyewall replacement cycle was complete. Hurricane Hunters then observed that Lowell regained Category 5 intensity a few hours later, with maximum sustained winds of 160 mph (260 km/h) and a minimum central pressure of 922 mbar (27.2 inHg). This made it the first Pacific hurricane to attain Category 5 intensity more than once since Hurricane Ioke in 2006 and only one of four Pacific hurricanes to do so on record, along with Hurricane Emilia in 1994, Ioke, and Hurricane Polo a few weeks later.

Soon after attaining Category 5 status a second time, Lowell again weakened slightly as its eye become less defined, possibly due to wind shear and dry air. The hurricane slowed on September 5 after the ridge to its north began weakening. This was partly due to an upper-level low, located north of Hawaii and moving to the southwest; the low caused Lowell to turn sharply northward. As wind shear increased and sea surface temperatures decreased, Lowell weakened below major hurricane strength on September 7. Around 09:00 UTC on September 8, the center of Lowell passed about 40 mi (64 km) west of Niʻihau. High wind shear caused the hurricane to weaken quickly, as the center became exposed from the convection. On September 9, Lowell dropped to tropical storm status. It turned back to the west due to a building ridge, where dry air continued to affect the storm. On September 11, the NHC redesignated Lowell as a post-tropical cyclone, more than 24 hours since the storm produced thunderstorms near the center.

=== Influence of climate change ===
Scientists from Climate Central concluded that anthropogenic climate change has made the unusually warm sea surface temperatures along Lowell’s path up to 60 times more likely. As the hurricane intensified, it moved over waters that were 0.7°C to 1.1°C (1°F to 2°F) warmer than normal, which human-caused climate change made 10-20 times more probable.

== Preparations ==
On September 6 (UTC), the NHC issued a hurricane watch for the eastern part of Papahānaumokuākea Marine National Monument and a tropical storm watch for Kauai County. Līhuʻe Airport was shut down in preparation of the hurricane. Later that day, the agency upgraded the watches to warnings. A flood watch was also in effect for the main Hawaiian Islands through September 8, with heavy rainfall expected to cause flash flooding and mudslides, especially on Kauaʻi and parts of the Big Island. Due to further eastward shifts in the forecast path of the storm, a hurricane watch was issued for Kauai County on September 7, 2026 (UTC) and further upgraded to a hurricane warning later that day. A few hours later, still more eastward shifts in the track forecast prompted a tropical storm watch, then a tropical storm warning, for Oahu. Early on September 8 (UTC), a tornado watch was issued for Kauai County and adjacent waters, the first tornado watch issued for the state of Hawaii on record.

On September 3, Hawaii governor Josh Green issued a state of emergency due to the threat from Lowell and potentially Karina. The state activated 129 Hawaii National Guard members while also sending six high-water vehicles to Kauai. Two state parks were closed to campers due to the hurricane. Campers were notified to vacate the parks immediately on September 4.

Many Ni'hau residents had traveled to Kauaʻi for a funeral ahead of Lowell's close pass by the island, and were unable make proper preparations.

== Impact ==
Wettest tropical cyclones and their remnants in Hawaii Highest-known totals
Precipitation			Storm	Location	Ref.
Rank	mm	in	Storm	Location	Ref.
1	1473	58.00	Lane 2018	Kahūnā Falls, Hawaii	
2	1321	52.00	Hiki 1950	Kanalohuluhulu Ranger Station	
3	1106	43.54	Lala 2026	Laupāhoehoe	
4	985	38.76	Paul 2000	Kapapala Ranch 36	
5	935	36.83	Nolo 2026	Mount Waiʻaleʻale	
6	635	25.00	Maggie 1970	Various stations	
7	536	21.11	Lowell 2026	Kilohana	
8	519	20.42	Nina 1957	Wainiha	
9	516	20.33	Iwa 1982	Intake Wainiha 1086	
10	476	18.75	Fabio 1988	Papaikou Mauka 140.1	

Rocks are seen pushed onto residential properties in Kekaha, Hawaii, after Hurricane Lowell's surf and storm surge impacts.

Prior to the brunt of impacts from Lowell, Kauaʻi's only weather radar was knocked out. The hurricane dropped heavy rainfall across Hawaii, peaking at 21.11 in (536 mm) in Kilohana on Kauaʻi. Wind gusts in the state peaked at 92 mph (148 km/h) at Puʻu Lua. Sustained winds to 59 mph (95 km/h) and a gust of 84 mph (135 km/h) were recorded at the Līhuʻe Airport. Powerful waves and storm surge moved into coastal areas such as Kekaha and Poʻipu, causing extensive damage to structures and roadways. In Kekaha, Kaumualiʻi Highway fronting Kekaha Beach was completely obstructed by rocks and road fragments. Kauaʻi Island Utility Cooperative reported that strong winds from Lowell knocked out power to over 91% of Kaua'i County. Power outages at the Waimea Wastewater Treatment Plant led to the spill of 20,000 gallons of wastewater.

Near Baby Beach in Poʻipū, a home was swept off of its foundation and onto neighboring properties. In Poʻipū, storm surge paired with high surf damaged parts of the Beach House Restaurant and the Sheraton Kauaʻi Resort, which were among those hit the hardest. A house in Hanapēpē lost its roof as a result of strong winds. Port Allen Boat Harbor was extensively damaged. Storm surge and surf also contributed to the destruction of Waimea Pier. Further west in Kekaha, multiple homes were damaged by hurricane-force winds and storm surge. In the commercial area of Līhuʻe, Hokulei Village and Kukui Grove sustained minor damages to their properties. Storm surge caused multiple shipping containers to be taken from Kaumālapa‘u Harbor, Lānaʻi's only commercial harbor, into the ocean. Bollards protecting the edge of the harbor were moved out of place or destroyed, damaging the harbor's protective seawall and causing multiple sinkholes to form.

A 74-year-old man in Kaua‘i was killed by the storm surge related to Lowell. A 59-year-old man was found dead in Wainiha. On Oʻahu, a tree fell on a homeless man's tent, killing him inside. Oahu recorded 21,000 power outages.

On September 18, it was reported that 18 homes in Kaua’i had been destroyed, with at least a 100 sustaining major damage. More than 700 additional homes were damaged in the county.

== Aftermath ==
A house in Waimea, Kauai, Hawaii, is seen with damage from Hurricane Lowell's powerful winds.

On September 7, the Hawaiʻi State Department of Education cancelled school for Kauaʻi and Oʻahu in advance of the storm's approach. Due to the damage left on Kauaʻi, the department extended the closure of schools on the island until September 11.

On September 8, the Līhuʻe Airport was reopened to travelers. HDOT advised that travelers should expect delays and allow extra time to check in and get through TSA. The following day, Hawaiian and Alaska Airlines issued a notice that 'longer than usual' lines at the airport were occurring. The island's two major shopping centers, Kukui Grove and The Shops at Kukui'ula were closed due to power loss.

Ni'hau residents were reported safe by island management, and there was a supply of food and water available for residents.

In response to cleanup efforts by residents, the County of Kauaʻi reopened the Kekaha Landfill and transfer stations across the island. Collection fees were waived temporarily. A wastewater spill was reported at the Waimea Wastewater Treatment Plant. In response to food and ice shortages caused by prolonged power outages, food distribution sites were set up in key points across the island. Local businesses such as Meme's Farmstand and The Musubi Truck offered free food to the community.

On September 9, Governor Josh Green reported that initial damage estimates indicate the storm will cost more than US$400 million, exceeding the damage from Hurricane Lala, which struck Hawaii a few weeks prior. Governor Green also stated that early in the recovery process, Lowell seemed to have caused more damage than Hurricane Iniki in 1992, the costliest tropical cyclone to hit the State of Hawaiʻi to date, with early estimates placing the total damage cost between $500 million and $1 billion. By September 23, Governor Green stated that the state had spent $112.4 million on post-Lowell recovery estimates, and over $1 billion on natural disaster recovery statewide throughout the year.

== See also ==
- Weather of 2026
- Tropical cyclones in 2026
- List of Category 5 Pacific hurricanes
- List of Hawaii hurricanes
- Hurricane Dot (1959) — Approached Hawaii from the south and made landfall in Kauai as a Category 1 hurricane
- March 2026 Hawaii floods — flooding earlier in 2026 that left more than $1 billion in damage
