= Hurricane Lala =

Category 4 Pacific hurricane in 2026

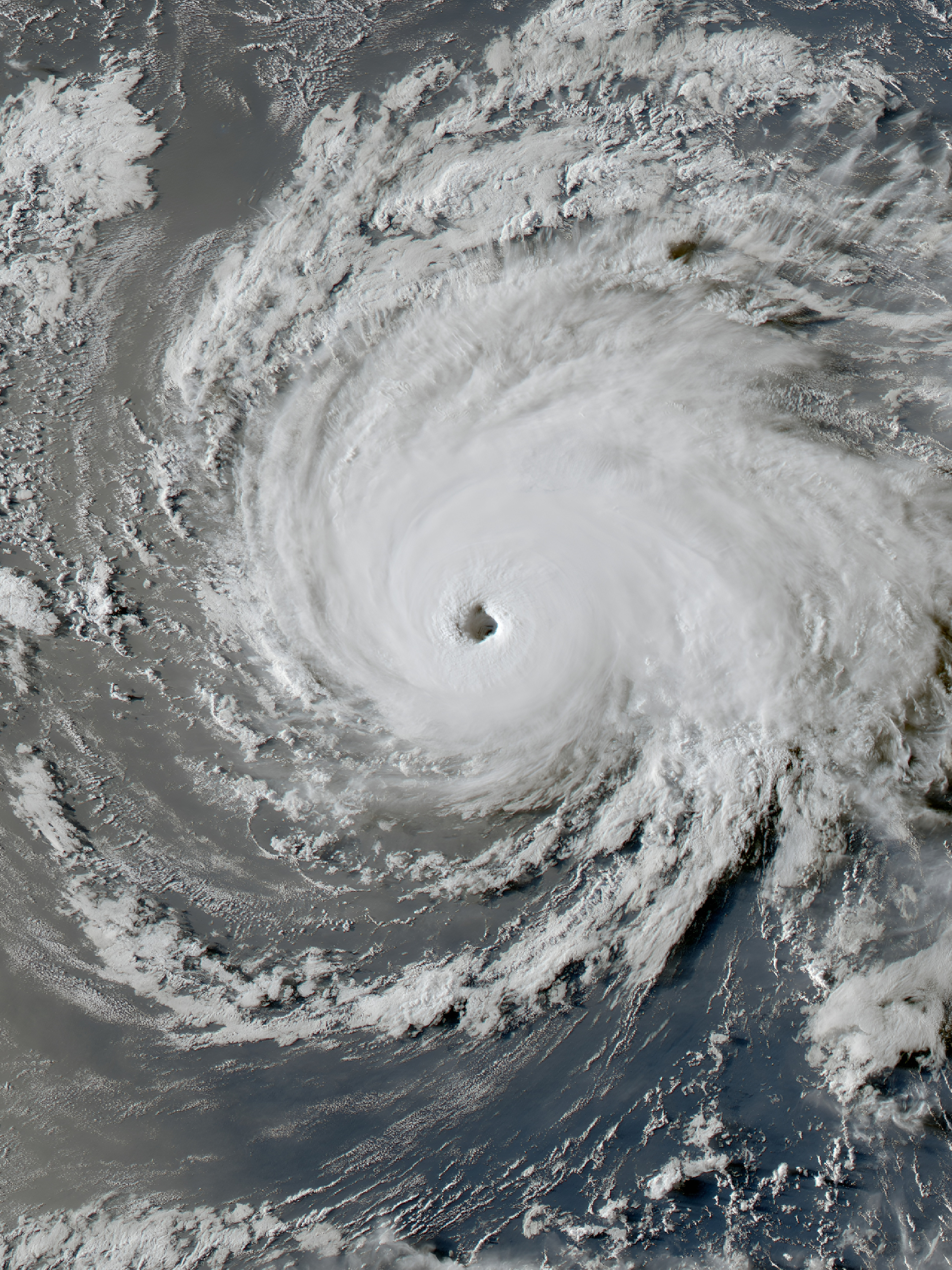
- Lala near peak intensity well west of the Hawaiian Islands late on August 19

Meteorological history
- Formed: August 13, 2026
- Remnant low: August 28, 2026
- Dissipated: August 30, 2026

Category 4 major hurricane
- 1-minute sustained (SSHWS/NWS)
- Highest winds: 130 mph (215 km/h)
- Lowest pressure: 947 mbar (hPa); 27.96 inHg

Overall effects
- Fatalities: 3 direct, 1 indirect
- Damage: $1 billion (2026 USD)
- Areas affected: Hawaiian Islands
- Part of the 2026 Pacific hurricane season

Hurricane Lala was the first hurricane to directly impact the Big Island since an unnamed hurricane in 1871 (Note: The National Hurricane Center officially defines a direct hit as, for locations on the right-hand side of the track, when the cyclone passes within a distance equal to twice the radius of maximum wind.) and the third-wettest tropical cyclone to affect the U.S. state of Hawaii on record. The ninth named storm, third hurricane, and second major hurricane of the 2026 Pacific hurricane season, Lala formed on August 12 from a tropical wave in the central Eastern Pacific, and it steadily intensified for the next couple of days. On August 15, Lala strengthened into a hurricane as it approached Hawaii's Big Island and reached its initial peak intensity early the following day. Interaction with the mountainous terrain of the island caused it to weaken back to a tropical storm later that day. While moving away from the Hawaiian Islands, Lala resumed intensifying and strengthened into a Category 4 hurricane on August 19. A powerful and long-lived tropical cyclone, Lala persisted for several more days over the open Pacific Ocean before finally degenerating to a remnant low well northwest of Hawaii on August 28.

Shortly after its formation, tropical cyclone watches and warnings were issued for every island in Hawaii. A state of emergency was declared for the entire state on August 13, and multiple shelters were opened as preparations were underway. Lala dropped torrential rainfall, leading to flash flooding and across many of the islands. Strong gusts, especially in the Big Island, downed power lines and trees which left hundreds of thousands of customers without electricity and, coupled by the flash floods, damaged or destroyed more than a hundred homes all throughout the state. As of August 22, at least four fatalities have been attributed to Lala.

== Meteorological history ==
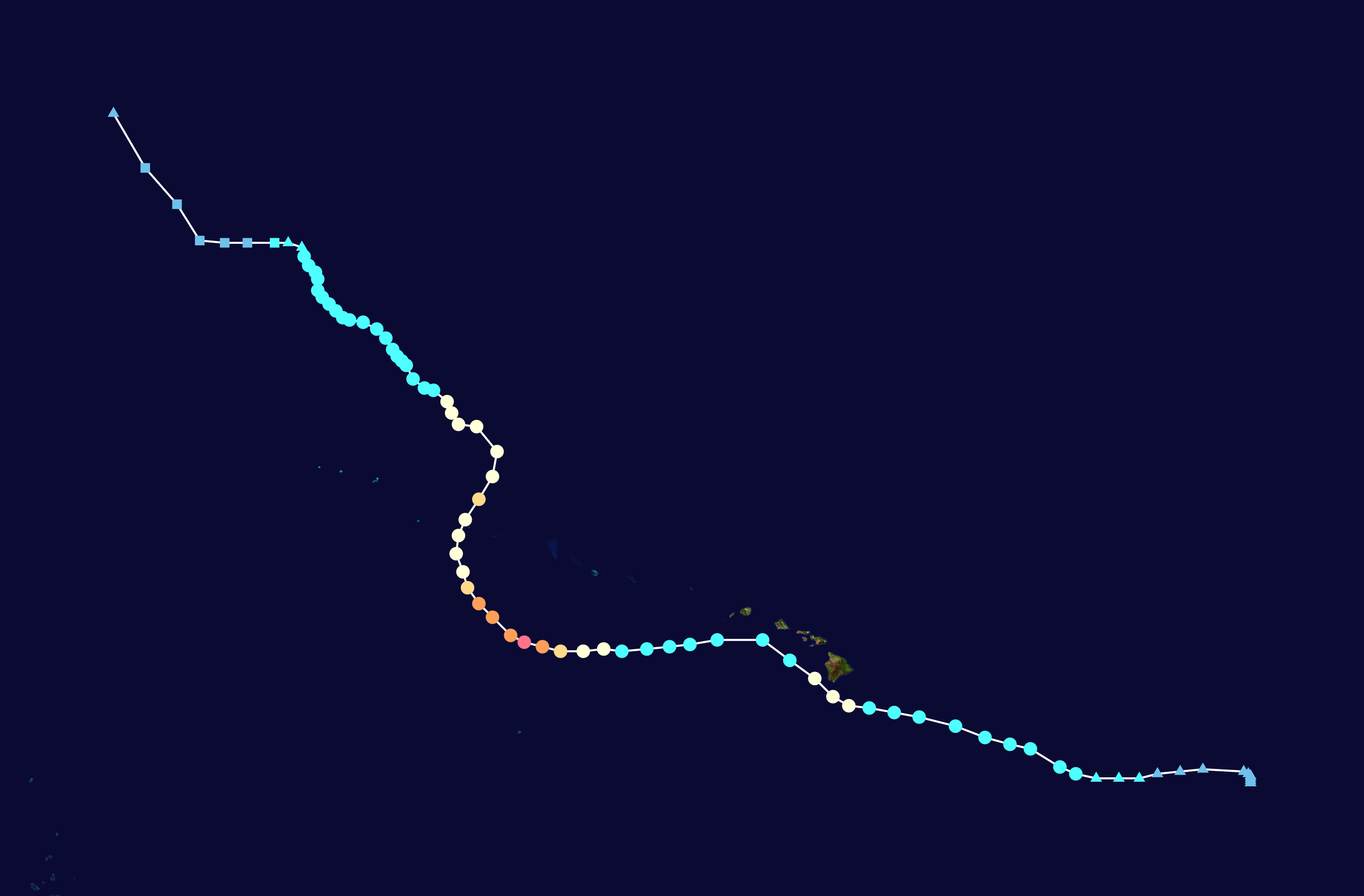
Map plotting the storm's track and intensity, according to the Saffir–Simpson scale Map key Saffir–Simpson scale Tropical depression (≤38 mph, ≤62 km/h) Tropical storm (39–73 mph, 63–118 km/h) Category 1 (74–95 mph, 119–153 km/h) Category 2 (96–110 mph, 154–177 km/h) Category 3 (111–129 mph, 178–208 km/h) Category 4 (130–156 mph, 209–251 km/h) Category 5 (≥157 mph, ≥252 km/h) Unknown Storm type Tropical cyclone Subtropical cyclone Extratropical cyclone, remnant low, tropical disturbance, or monsoon depression

On August 4, the National Hurricane Center (NHC) began noting the potential of a tropical wave located over the central Eastern Pacific for tropical cyclogenesis over the following few days as it moved into a more conducive environment. An area of low pressure developed in association with this tropical wave on August 7 as it was located well to the east-southeast of Hawaii. After several days of slow organization and attaining gale-force winds, at 15:00 UTC on August 13, the system consolidated sufficiently to be designated as a tropical storm and given the name Lala. The storm began to steadily intensify within a mostly favorable environment with mid-level dry air being the only limiting factor for intensification. Deep convection and the strongest sustained winds at this time remained displaced to the north of the center of circulation. Lala remained rather disorganized until late the following day, when the circulation began to compact and deep convection formed closer to the circulation center. On August 15, Lala began to develop an eye-like feature on radar imagery, signaling a return to intensification. At 19:00 UTC that day (9 AM local time) NHC upgraded Lala to a Category 1 hurricane.

Early on August 16, Lala made its closest approach to the Big Island and its eyewall grazed the southern part of the island. Due to land interaction, Lala began to weaken as it moved away from the Big Island. At 12:00 UTC that day, Lala was downgraded to a tropical storm. Despite moderate wind shear and a dry mid-level environment, Lala began to reorganize and was upgraded to a hurricane again early on August 18. At 18:00 UTC that day, Lala was upgraded to a Category 2 hurricane. The hurricane continued to strengthen and on August 19, Lala was upgraded to a Category 3 hurricane. Lala further strengthened to a Category 4 hurricane by 09:00 UTC that day, with winds reaching 130 mph (215 km/h) and a minimum central pressure of 947 mbar. The next day, wind shear, dry air, and colder waters began to affect Lala, bringing the system below major hurricane strength. After meandering towards the northwest for a few days, Lala degenerated into a post-tropical cyclone early on August 28. Later that day, the system crossed the international date line, with the Joint Typhoon Warning Center (JTWC) marking it as a subtropical system, while the Japan Meteorological Agency (JMA) classified it as a non-tropical low. On the morning of August 30, the JTWC reported that the system had dissipated.

== Preparations ==
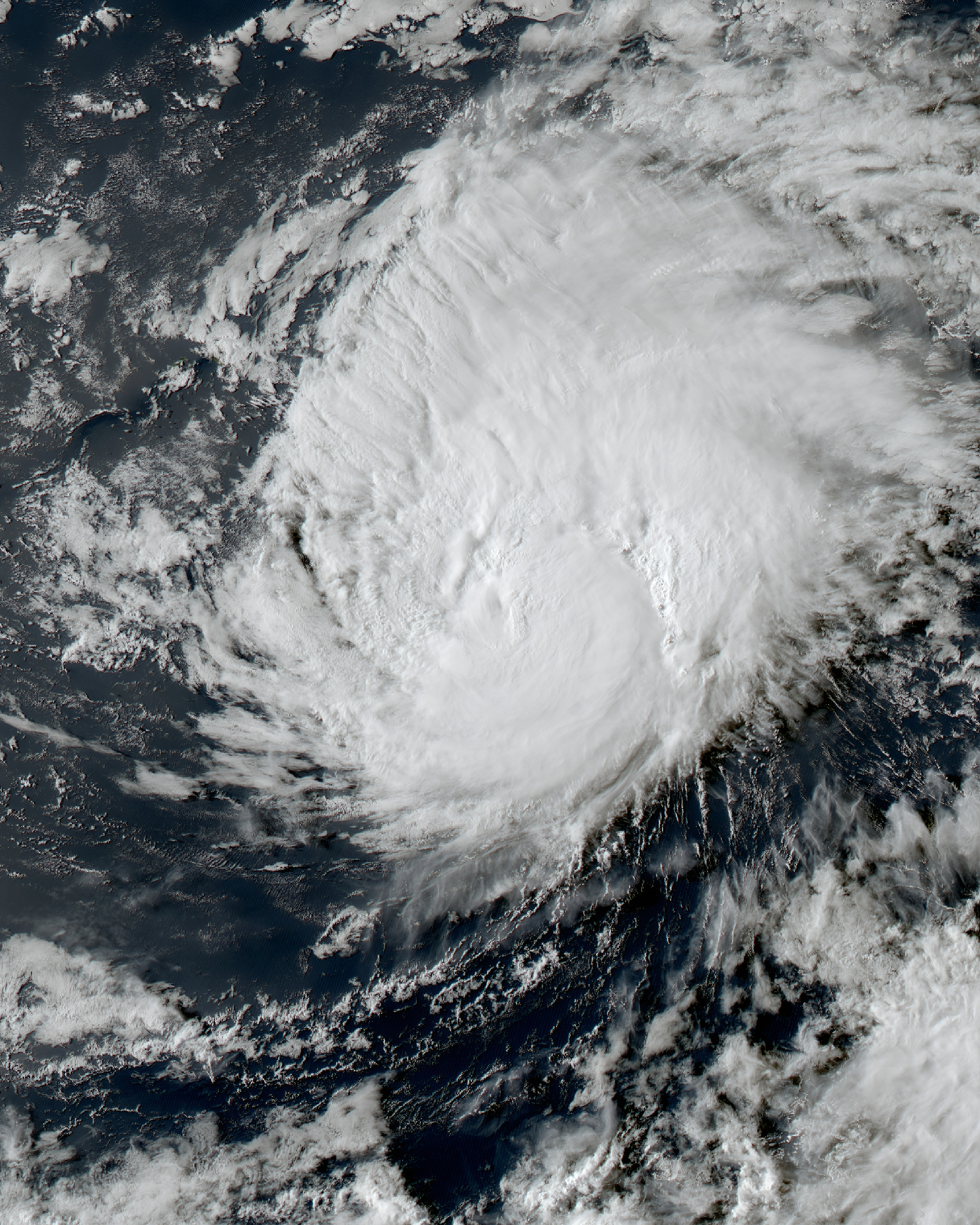
Hurricane Lala grazing the Big Island at its initial peak intensity on August 16

Upon Lala's formation as a tropical cyclone on the morning of August 13, a hurricane watch was issued for the Big Island. The hurricane watch was upgraded to a hurricane warning 12 hours later as confidence in hurricane conditions on the island increased. Maui County was placed under a tropical storm warning before Tropical Storm warnings were expanded to the remainder of the main Hawaiian Islands a few hours later. Flood watches were issued for all of the main Hawaiian Islands as well. A state of emergency was issued by Hawaii Governor Josh Green on August 13, activating emergency funds and the Hawaii National Guard. The mayor of Hawaiʻi County issued an emergency proclamation. The United States Coast Guard declared Port Condition Zulu for commercial harbors on the Island of Hawai'i and Port Condition Yankee for commercial harbors on Maui, declaring high potential for severe weather. Lower ranking port signals were issued for harbors on other islands.

The American Red Cross required refresher training for volunteers to conduct disaster response. The Hawaii State Department of Education closed all school campuses for the weekend, and then Sunday night announced that all school campuses would remain closed on August 17 to facilitate cleanups and campus safety assessments. Honolulu city services halted special Saturday operations. Public transit on the Big Island was cancelled during Lala's passage. Hawaiʻi Volcanoes National Park restricted access to Mauna Loa and Red Hill past Kīpukapuaulu. Several shelters were opened in Hawaiʻi, Maui, Honolulu, and Kaua'i counties. Hawaiian Airlines and Alaska Airlines cancelled all flights to and out of Hilo International Airport. Kona International Airport was also shut down in advance of the storm. Four neighbor island flights from and to Līhuʻe Airport were cancelled. Kahului Airport on Maui and Daniel K. Inouye International Airport on Oʻahu operated at reduced or normal levels. TheBus service in Honolulu was suspended during the storm. Flood channels in South Kona were cleared to prepare for flooding. Streams in Oʻahu were also cleared for flooding.

As Lala moved towards the Northwestern Hawaiian Islands on August 18, a hurricane watch was issued for islands between Lisianski Island and Maro Reef and a tropical storm watch was issued between Maro Reef and the French Frigate Shoals. Upon Lala's rapid intensification early the next day, these watches were upgraded to warnings. All were cancelled by 21:00 UTC on August 21 as Lala moved away from the islands.

== Impact ==
Wettest tropical cyclones and their remnants in Hawaii Highest-known totals
Precipitation			Storm	Location	Ref.
Rank	mm	in	Storm	Location	Ref.
1	1473	58.00	Lane 2018	Kahūnā Falls, Hawaii	
2	1321	52.00	Hiki 1950	Kanalohuluhulu Ranger Station	
3	1106	43.54	Lala 2026	Laupāhoehoe	
4	985	38.76	Paul 2000	Kapapala Ranch 36	
5	935	36.83	Nolo 2026	Mount Waiʻaleʻale	
6	635	25.00	Maggie 1970	Various stations	
7	536	21.11	Lowell 2026	Kilohana	
8	519	20.42	Nina 1957	Wainiha	
9	516	20.33	Iwa 1982	Intake Wainiha 1086	
10	476	18.75	Fabio 1988	Papaikou Mauka 140.1	

Despite not making a direct landfall on any of the main Hawaiian islands, Lala still produced strong winds. A wind gust of 140 miles per hour (230 km/h) was observed on the peak of Mauna Kea on the Big Island. Statewide, the hurricane damaged or destroyed more than 100 homes. About 200,000 customers across the state lost electricity during the storm. Researchers at the University of Hawaiʻi stated the rainfall dropped by Lala was equivalent to 1.3 trillion gallons of water. Agricultural damage across Hawaii reached $3 million. Total losses across the state were estimated to have been approximately $108 million, according to Governor Josh Green.

=== Big Island ===
Lala became the first direct hurricane impact on the Big Island since an unnamed hurricane in 1871. Rainfall peaked at 43.42 in (1,103 mm) in Laupahoehoe, with totals over 20 in (510 mm) being recorded at 24 different locations on the Big Island. Rainfall rates in Nāʻālehu reached 4.4 inches (110 mm) within a single hour, the highest hourly rainfall total observed in Hawaii during Lala. In a rare occurrence, snowfall occurred on Mauna Kea during the storm. Multiple power lines and poles were downed along 42 miles (68 km) of the Hāmākua coast. Sixteen transmission lines on the Big Island were damaged. A total of 19 roofs were torn off by strong winds. Telecommunication outages caused 911 services on the Big Island to temporarily cease. A power outage affected the Grand Naniloa Hotel in Hilo, impacting 600 guests and limiting elevator service to a single elevator.

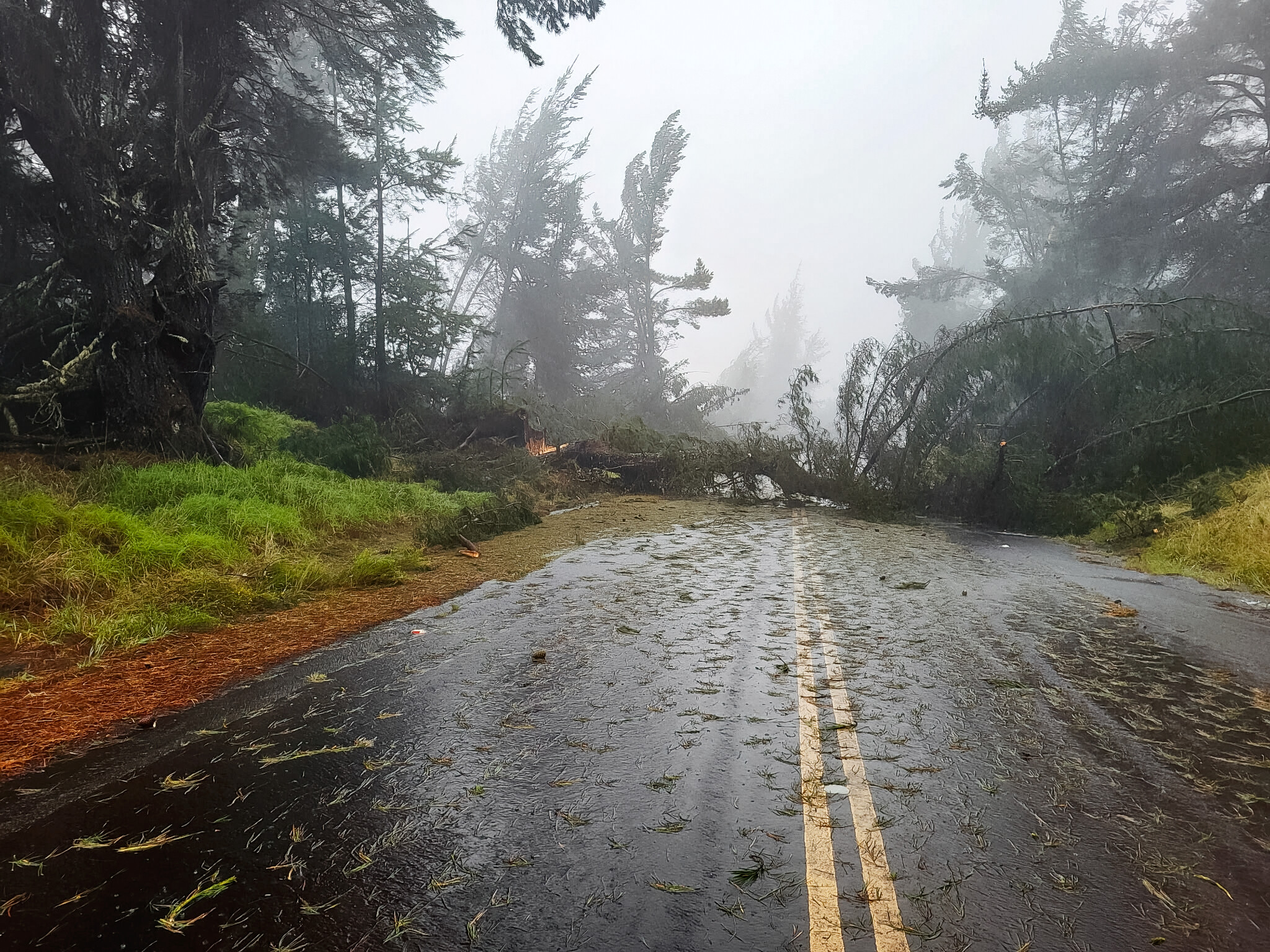
Downed trees blocking a road near Mauna Kea on the Big Island

Heavy rainfall caused the issuance of a flash flood warning for Kaʻū which became isolated by flooding. A flash flood emergency was also issued for parts of the Big Island. Steep mountain slopes combined with record rainfall rates caused devastating flash floods in the town of Nāʻālehu. Flash floods swept away two dwellings in the community. Two cemeteries were also swept away in Nāʻālehu. Headstones and remains were unearthed at these cemeteries. More than 60 bodies were recovered from Nāʻālehu Cemetery after the storm. Floodwaters also swept several residences off their foundations in Waiʻōhinu. Roughly 30 roadways across the island were shut down due to flooding, including portions of the Hawaiʻi Belt Road. Six bridges were destroyed by floods, isolating the community of Pāhala and the Kaʻū Hospital. Two paramedics were rescued after an ambulance was submerged in Ka‘ū.

One person died and two others were injured in a vehicle accident related to the storm in Hawaiian Ocean View. In addition, a 93-year-old woman was found deceased in Nāʻālehu following the storm. Another woman was hospitalized after she was swept 100 yards (91 m) by floodwaters in Waiʻōhinu. A few days after the hurricane on the afternoon of August 18, an unidentified man was discovered deceased in a pasture near Hawaiʻi Belt Road in Nāʻālehu, with authorities declaring the death as storm related. A second deceased body was recovered in another field after the storm with the death also being designated as storm related. Damage on the Big Island totaled approximately $50 million.

=== Maui County ===
Satellite imagery depicting power outages on the Hawaiian Islands following Hurricane Lala.

A maximum wind gust of 74 miles per hour (119 km/h) was recorded in Olowalu on Maui. Rainfall totals in Maui County peaked at 6.6 inches (170 mm). Several hundred power outages were reported across Maui. Strong winds caused a eucalyptus tree fall onto and damage the roof of St. Joseph Church in Makawao, resulting in significant water damage to the ground-level of the church. The Makawao Department of Water Supply Field Office also suffered roof and water damage from the storm. Several hundred feet of power lines were downed by the storm in Makawao. A decades-old wooden bridge in Nāhiku was swept away by floods, trapping several residents. A boat sank at a harbor in Māʻalaea and a dock at the same harbor suffered damage. A landslide occurred in Hāna where several trees also fell. This was the only reported landslide from the storm in Maui. Maui County officials received a total of 74 damage reports due to Lala with the majority occurring in Maui's Upcountry. A cat sanctuary on the island of Lānaʻi suffered at least $15,000 worth of damage to 30 cat houses, a carport, and a storage shed.

=== O'ahu ===
Lifeguards in Honolulu made 59 water rescues due to swells from Lala. Rainfall rates of 2 inches (51 mm) per hour were observed on Oʻahu, while rainfall totals reached 5.5 inches (140 mm). Water levels rose in several streams as a result of the rainfall. This included Manoa Stream which set a record flow of 14 feet (4.3 m). A flash flood warning was issued for parts of O'ahu. Interstate H-1 in Downtown Honolulu was obstructed due to flooding. Strong winds also affected O’ahu, with a maximum sustained wind of 39 miles per hour (63 km/h) being observed. A tree fell onto a power line near the Honolulu Zoo, striking a pedestrian in the head. Downed trees also blocked several roadways across O'ahu including the Kamehameha Highway through Haleʻiwa and the Pali Highway in Kailua. Strong winds tore the roof off a house in Kalihi. Traffic was blocked on Kalākaua Avenue in Waikīkī as equipment covers were torn from the roof of the Sheraton Princess Kaiulani Hotel. The Honolulu Police Department responded to 162 calls as a result of the storm.

=== Kaua'i ===
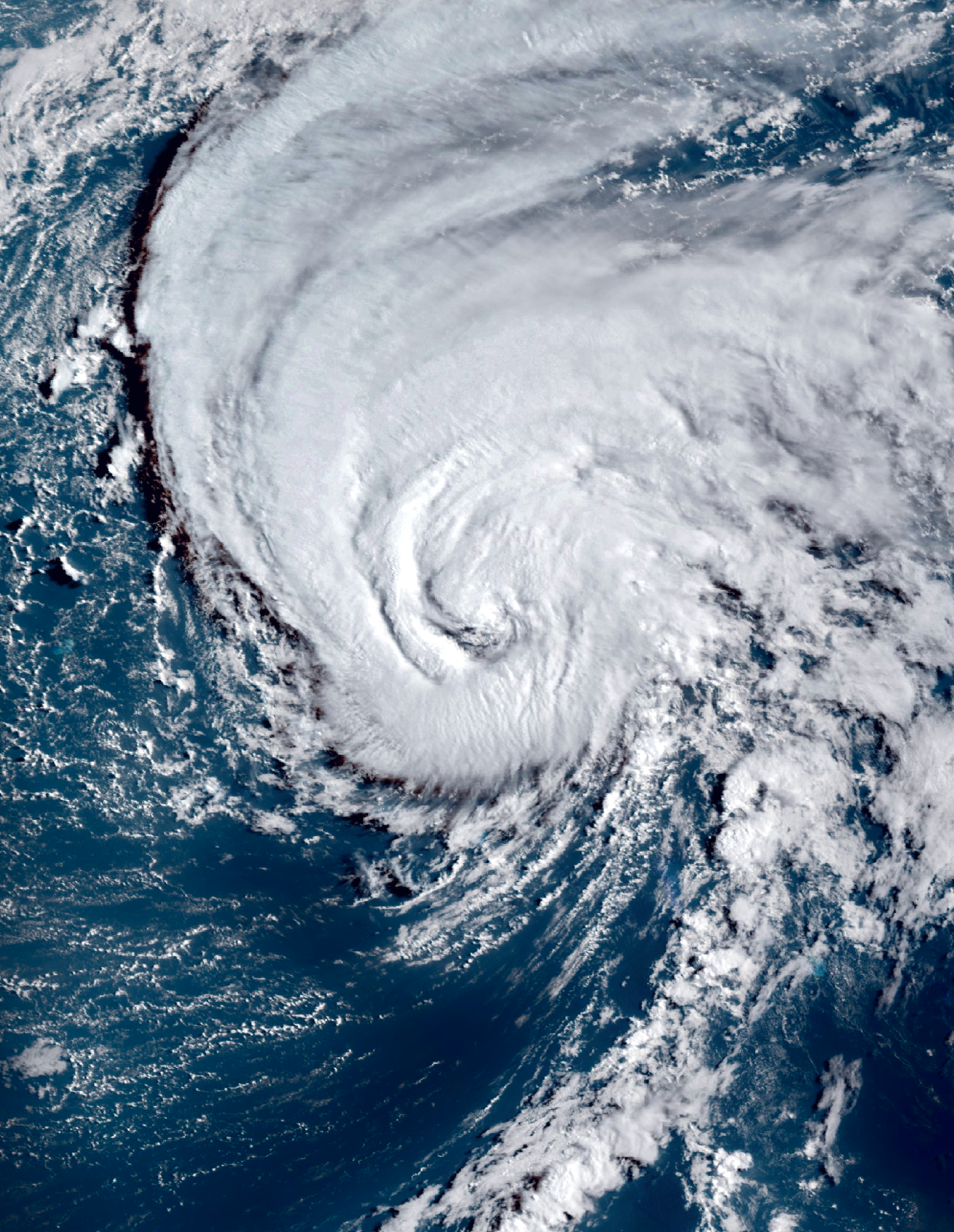
Hurricane Lala crossing over the Northwest Hawaiian Islands on August 21

Making the closest approach to the island in the daylight hours of August 16, Lala brought heavy rain and tropical storm force winds to Kaua'i. A 24-hour precipitation total of 10.25 inches (260.35 mm) was observed at the Kilohana rain gauge. A maximum wind gust of 60 miles per hour (97 km/h) was observed in Port Allen. A flash flood warning was issued for the island of Kaua'i. The Hanalei Bridge was closed in correlation to the flooding. On the north shore, flooding occurred on Kuhio Highway at Hāʻena Beach Park. The road was deemed temporarily impassable due to Manoa Stream flowing over the road. Nearby in Wainiha, flooding closed the roadway near the intersection of Kuhio Highway and Wainiha Powerhouse Road. In Poʻipū, multiple trees were uprooted near residential and recreational areas. In Hanapēpē Heights, roofs and trees suffered damage from destructive tropical storm force winds. At the peak of Lala's effects on the island, Kaua'i Island Utility Cooperative reported that more than 7,500 customers were without power.

=== Northwest Hawaiian Islands and offshore effects ===
Laysan Island suffered significant damage to vegetation. Seabird burrows were buried under sand. Multiple seabirds were found deceased after the storm. However, overall damage was less than expected from the storm. Offshore the Papahānaumokuākea Marine National Monument, the vessel IMUA and its 16-member crew encountered Lala which passed just to the north, causing a delay in their cleanup efforts of Papahānaumokuākea.

== Aftermath ==
A brown water advisory was issued for the Big Island shortly following the storm, warning of high pollutants in standing water. A water boil advisory was also issued for Pāhala following a water outage. The Hawaii National Guard and United States Coast Guard deployed troops to the flood-stricken communities of Nāʻālehu and Waiʻōhinu to conduct search and rescue operations. Hawaiʻi County officials provided a convoy of essential supplies to the community of Kaʻū. Supplies were also airlifted to the Wood Valley area. The Hawaiian Council allocated $300,000 to recovery efforts. The Hawaii State Department of Education placed more than 600 work orders to repair damage to schools statewide. All schools except for Nāʻālehu Elementary Schools and Kau High and Pahala Elementary School were expected to reopen on August 20, while the remaining two schools remained closed due to significant storm damage. Supplemental Nutrition Assistance Program allowed for reimbursements on food damaged by the storm. Hawaii Vibrant, a non-profit on the Big Island, received 1,200 requests for aid following the storm. The Hawaii State Legislature approved a $100 million recovery fund for Fiscal Year 2027. Salesforce co-founder Marc Benioff and Dell Technologies founder Michael Dell both donated $1 million to relief efforts. Retailer Tadashi Yanai donated $3 million for recovery.

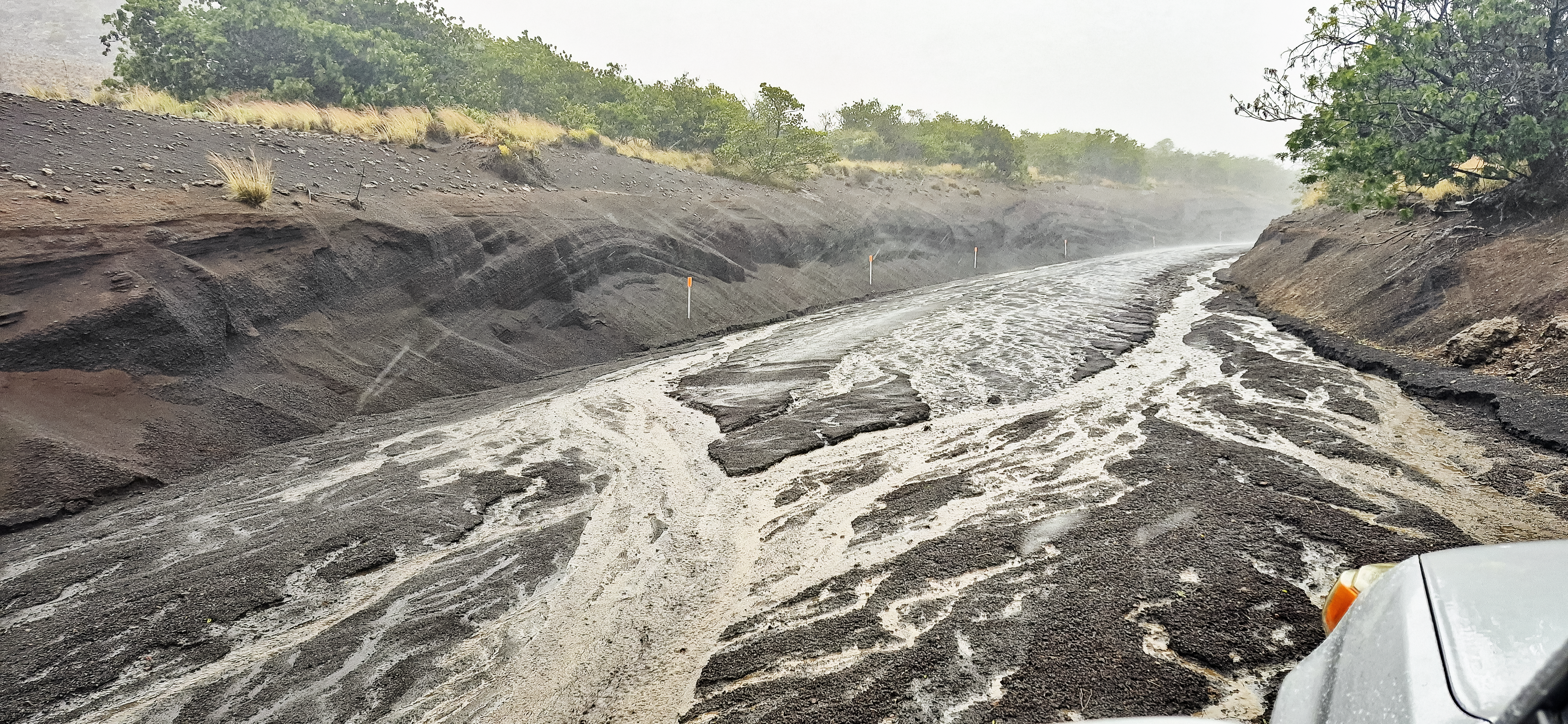
A road damaged by flooding and erosion near Mauna Kea on the Big Island

A minimum required payout amount of $200,000 was made by The Nature Conservancy which established the first coral reef insurance policy in the United States in 2022. Money from this payout was used for clearing debris and reattaching coral in reefs. Hawaiian Electric Industries reported significant damage to the power grid across the Hawaiian Islands. Thousands of crews were deployed to restore electricity. Governor Henry McMaster sent in fire teams to Hawaii after Lala from South Carolina. The Hawaiian Humane Society collected 217 animals displaced by the hurricane, of which, only 14 were returned to owners.

Tropical Storm Moke threatened Hawaii just a few days after the passage of Lala, threatening to bring additional rainfall and flooding to the Big Island. Members of the Hawaii Army National Guard and Hawaii Air National Guard were deployed to the southern region of the Big Island to begin storm preparations for Moke in conjunction with ongoing recovery efforts from Lala. On August 25, U.S. President Donald Trump approved a federal disaster declaration for Hawaii, allowing for the Federal Emergency Management Agency to provide assistance in recovery on the Big Island. Governor Josh Green allowed the Hawaii Department of Taxation to waive penalties for affected residents who could not pay their taxes on time due to Lala.

== See also ==
- Weather of 2026
- Tropical cyclones in 2026
- List of the wettest tropical cyclones in the United States
- List of Category 4 Pacific hurricanes
- List of Hawaii hurricanes
