= List of Category 4 Pacific hurricanes =

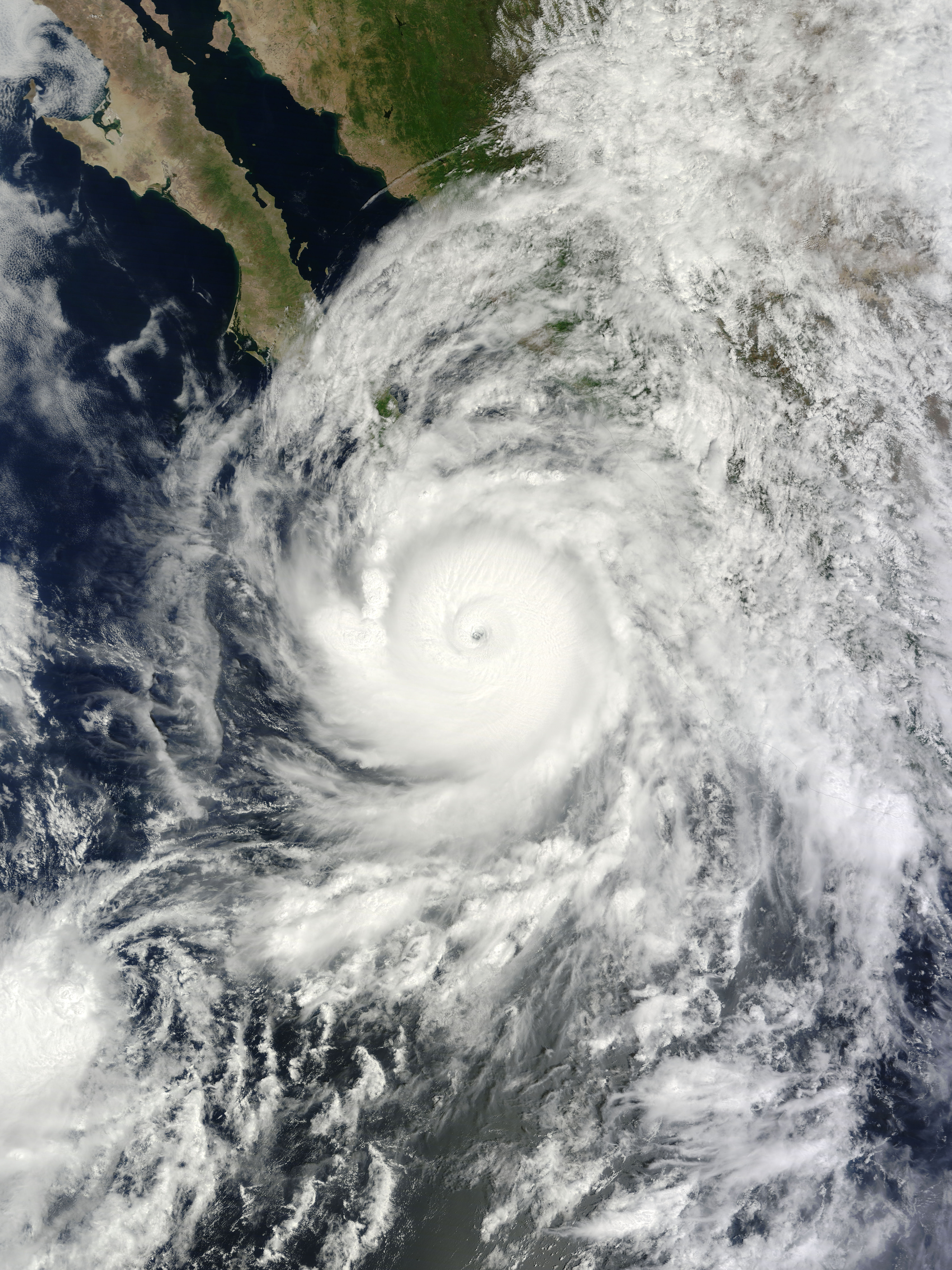
Hurricane Odile after its peak intensity. Odile had the lowest atmospheric pressure of a Category 4 hurricane in the Pacific basin, east of 180°W, at 918 mbar (hPa; 27.11 inHg).

Category 4, the second-highest classification on the Saffir–Simpson scale, (Note: The Saffir–Simpson scale, devised in 1971, is used to categorize the intensity of tropical cyclones in the Atlantic and Pacific Oceans.) is used for tropical cyclones that have winds of 130–156 mph (209–251 km/h; 113–136 kn). The division of the eastern and central Pacific basins occurs at 140° W; the eastern Pacific covers area east of 140° W, while the central Pacific extends between 140° W to 180° W. Both basins' division points are at 66° N as a northern point and the equator as the southern point. As of 2026, 151 hurricanes have attained Category 4 status in the northeastern Pacific basins. This list does not include storms that also attained Category 5 status on the scale.

Numerous climatological factors influence the formation of hurricanes in the Pacific basins. The North Pacific High and Aleutian Low, usually present between January and April, cause strong wind shear and unfavorable conditions for the development of hurricanes. During its presence, El Niño results in increased numbers of powerful hurricanes through weaker wind shear, while La Niña reduces the number of such hurricanes through the opposite. Global warming may also influence the formation of tropical cyclones in the Pacific basin. During a thirty-year period with two sub-periods, the first between 1975 and 1989 and the second between 1990 and 2004, an increase of thirteen Category 4 or 5 storms was observed from the first sub-period.

== Statistics and background ==
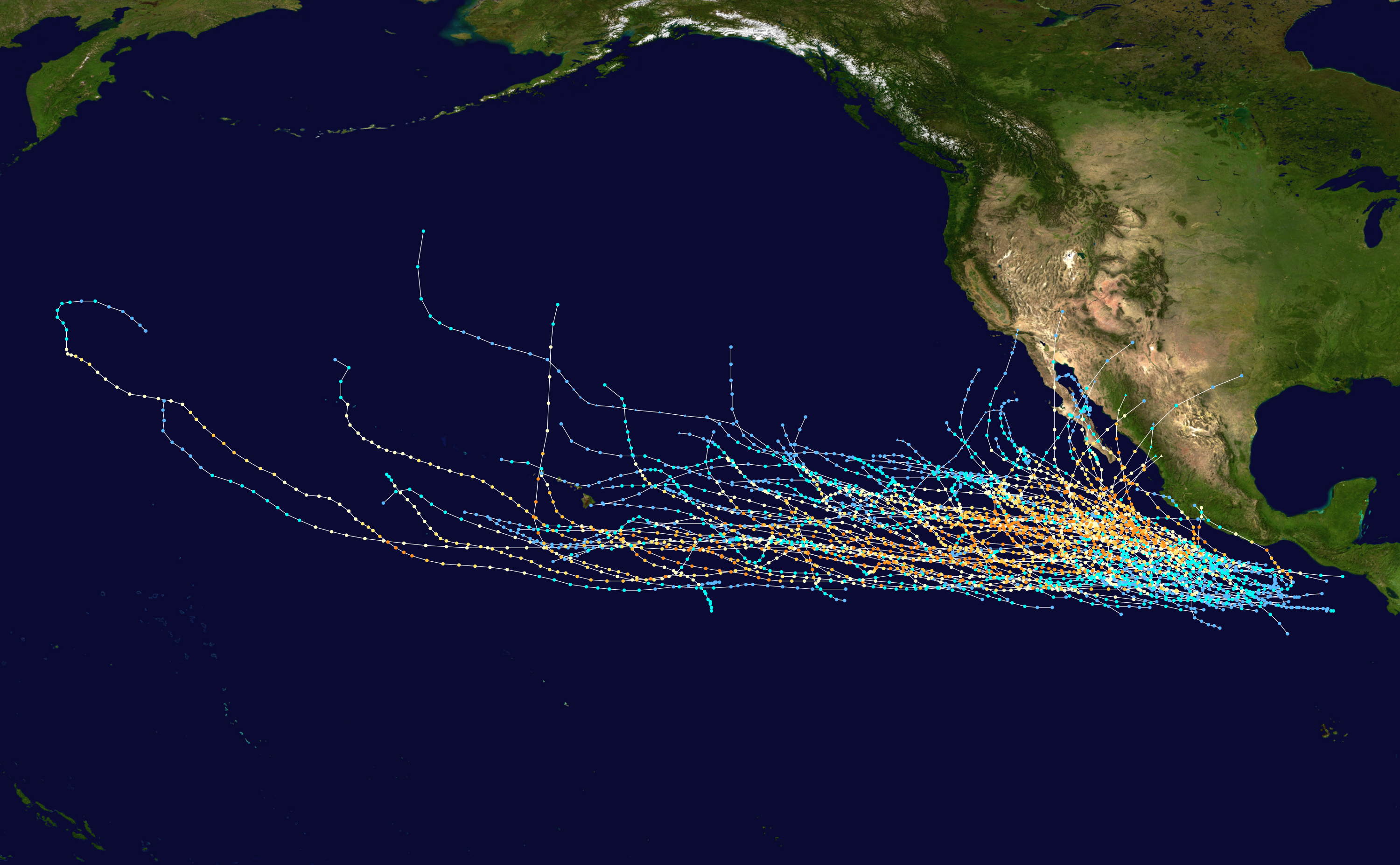
Tracks of all known Category 4 Pacific hurricanes from 1949 to 2011 in the central and eastern Pacific basins

On the Saffir–Simpson Hurricane Scale, "Category 4" is the second-most powerful classification, with winds ranging between 130 and 156 mph (209 and 251 km/h; 113 and 136 kn). When these hurricanes make landfall, impacts are usually severe but are not as destructive as Category 5 hurricanes that come ashore. The term "maximum sustained wind" refers to the average wind speed measured during the period of one minute at the height of 10 feet (3.0 m) above the ground. The windspeed is measured at that height to prevent disruption from obstructions. Wind gusts in tropical cyclones are usually approximately 30% stronger than the one-minute maximum sustained winds.

The northeastern Pacific hurricane basins are divided into two parts – eastern and central. The eastern Pacific basin extends from all areas of the Pacific north of the equator east of 140° W, while the central Pacific basin includes areas north of the equator between 140° W and 180° W. Both basins extend to the Arctic Circle at 66° N.

When tropical cyclones cross from the Atlantic into the Pacific, the name of the previous storm is retained if the system continues to exhibit tropical characteristics; however, when hurricanes degenerate into a remnant low-pressure area, the system is designated with the next name on the rotating eastern Pacific hurricane naming list.

Since 1900, 151 Category 4 hurricanes have been recorded in the eastern and central Pacific basins. Of these, fourteen have attained Category 4 status on more than one occasion, by weakening to a status on the Saffir–Simpson Hurricane Scale lower than Category 4 and later restrengthening into a Category 4. Such storms are demarcated by the dates they first attained and the final time they lost the intensity. Only four storms, Hurricane Fico in 1978, Hurricane Norbert in 1984, Hurricane Hector in 2018, and Hurricane Dora in 2023, reached Category 4 status three times or more.

Between 1970 and 1975, advisories for systems in the eastern Pacific basins were initiated by the Eastern Pacific Hurricane Center (EPHC) as part of the National Weather Service (NWS) office in San Francisco, California. At that time, the advisories released were written in cooperation with the United States Navy Fleet Weather Center in Alameda and the Air Force Hurricane Liaison Officer at the McClellan Air Force Base. Following the move of the hurricane center to Redwood City in 1976, track files were created and altered by Arthur Pike and were later re-modified following the release of a study in 1980. The National Hurricane Center (NHC) extended its authority to the EPHC in 1988, and subsequently began maintaining the tracks.

== Climatology ==
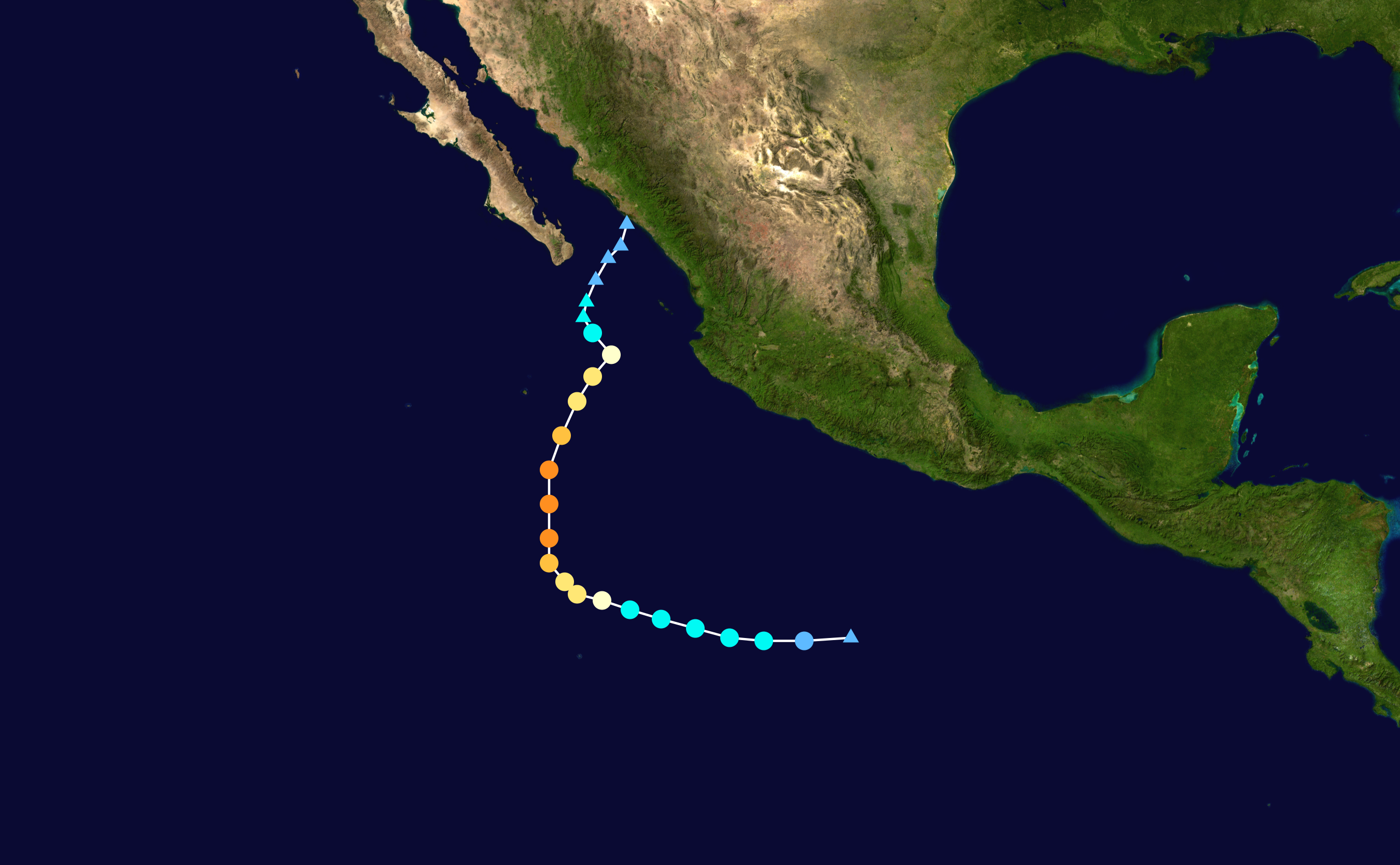
The track of Hurricane Sandra in 2015, which is the latest-forming Category 4 hurricane on record in the northeastern Pacific basin.

A total of 151 Category 4 hurricanes have been recorded in the eastern and central Pacific basins since 1900. It is theorized that global warming was responsible for an increase of 13 Category 4 and 5 storms that developed in the eastern Pacific, from 36 in the period of 1975–1989 to 49 in the period of 1990–2004. It was estimated that if sea-surface temperatures ascended by 2 to 2.5 degrees, the intensity of tropical cyclones would increase by 6–10% internationally. During years with the existence of an El Niño, sea-surface temperatures increase in the eastern Pacific, resulting in an increase in activity as vertical wind shear decreases in the Pacific; the opposite happens in the Atlantic basin during El Niño, when wind shear increases creating an unfavourable environment for tropical cyclone formation in the Atlantic. Contrary to El Niño, La Niña increases wind shear over the eastern Pacific and reduces it over the Atlantic.

The presence of a semi-permanent high-pressure area known as the North Pacific High in the eastern Pacific is a dominant factor against formation of tropical cyclones in the winter, as the Pacific High results in wind shear that causes environmental conditions for tropical cyclone formation to be unconducive. Its effects in the central Pacific basin are usually related to keeping cyclones away from the Hawaiian Islands. Due to westward trade winds, hurricanes in the Pacific nearly never head eastward, although several storms have defied the odds and headed eastward. A second factor preventing tropical cyclones from forming during the winter is the occupation of a semi-permanent low-pressure area designated the Aleutian Low between January and April. Its presence over western Canada and the northwestern United States contributes to the area's occurrences of precipitation in that duration. In addition, its effects in the central Pacific near 160° W causes tropical waves that form in the area to drift northward into the Gulf of Alaska and dissipate. Its retreat in late-April allows the warmth of the Pacific High to meander in, bringing its powerful clockwise wind circulation with it. The Intertropical Convergence Zone departs southward in mid-May permitting the formation of the earliest tropical waves, coinciding with the start of the eastern Pacific hurricane season on May 15.

Cooler waters near the Baja California peninsula are thought to prevent storms in the eastern Pacific from transitioning into an extratropical cyclone; as of 2009, only three storms listed in the database are known to have successfully completed an extratropical transition.

== Systems ==
=== Pre-1975 ===
In the years between 1957 and 1974, 8 Category 4 hurricanes formed within the confines of the Pacific Ocean. A dagger (†) denotes that the storm temporarily weakened below Category 4 intensity during the specified period of time. As the Pacific hurricane database only goes back to 1949, the 1943 Mazatlán hurricane is not included, although it attained Category 4-equivalent winds at 136 mph (219 km/h). It is unknown if the winds observed were sustained. Storms that formed in the eastern or central Pacific but strengthened to reach Category 4 status in the western Pacific basin (west of 180° W) are not included.

List of Category 4 Pacific hurricanes from 1957-1974
Storm name	Track	Season	Dates as a Category 4	Hours	Maximum sustained winds	Minimum pressure	Notes
Unnamed		1957	October 21–22	12 hours	140 mph (220 km/h)	Unknown	
Dot†		1959	August 2–5	72 hours	150 mph (240 km/h)	952 hPa (28.1 inHg)	
"Mexico"		1959	October 26–27	36 hours	140 mph (220 km/h)	955 hPa (28.2 inHg)	
Denise		1971	July 9	12 hours	140 mph (220 km/h)	951 hPa (28.1 inHg)	
Celeste		1972	August 14	12 hours	130 mph (215 km/h)	940 hPa (28 inHg)	
Doreen		1973	July 20	6 hours	140 mph (220 km/h)	968 hPa (28.6 inHg)	
Emily		1973	July 23	6 hours	140 mph (220 km/h)	972 hPa (28.7 inHg)	
Maggie		1974	August 28–29	24 hours	140 mph (220 km/h)	934 hPa (27.6 inHg)	
Notes: † The storm noted formed or attained Category 4 status in the central Pacific basin but may have formed in the eastern Pacific basin; ‡ The storm noted attained Category 4 status more than once; * The storm noted was both a Category 4 in the eastern and central Pacific basins; ** The storm noted originated in the Atlantic basin, but later intensified into a Category 4 hurricane in the eastern Pacific basin; # Storms that attained Category 4 status at one point but intensified into Category 5 at a later time are not included.

=== 1975–1999 ===
In the years between 1974 and 1999, 70 Category 4 hurricanes formed within the confines of the Pacific Ocean. A dagger (†) denotes that the storm temporarily weakened below Category 4 intensity during the specified period of time.

List of Category 4 Pacific hurricanes from 1975–1999
Storm name	Track	Season	Dates as a Category 4	Hours	Maximum sustained winds	Minimum pressure	Notes
Denise		1975	July 9	12 hours	140 mph (220 km/h)	Unknown	
Katrina		1975	September 3	6 hours	130 mph (215 km/h)	Unknown	
Annette		1976	June 8–11	54 hours	140 mph (220 km/h)	925 hPa (27.3 inHg)	
Iva		1976	August 28	12 hours	130 mph (215 km/h)	Unknown	
Liza		1976	September 29 – October 1	42 hours	140 mph (220 km/h)	948 hPa (28.0 inHg)	
Madeline		1976	October 7–8	12 hours	145 mph (230 km/h)	940 hPa (28 inHg)	
Carlotta‡		1978	June 21–22	24 hours	130 mph (215 km/h)	Unknown	
Fico‡		1978	July 11–16	72 hours	140 mph (220 km/h)	955 hPa (28.2 inHg)	
Hector		1978	July 25	18 hours	140 mph (220 km/h)	Unknown	
Norman		1978	September 2–3	36 hours	140 mph (220 km/h)	Unknown	
Susan†		1978	October 21	6 hours	130 mph (215 km/h)	Unknown	
Enrique		1979	August 22	18 hours	145 mph (230 km/h)	Unknown	
Ignacio		1979	October 27–28	18 hours	145 mph (230 km/h)	938 hPa (27.7 inHg)	
Kay		1980	September 18	18 hours	140 mph (220 km/h)	Unknown	
Olivia		1982	September 21–22	30 hours	145 mph (230 km/h)	Unknown	
Barbara		1983	June 13–14	24 hours	130 mph (215 km/h)	Unknown	
Henriette		1983	July 30–31	18 hours	130 mph (215 km/h)	Unknown	
Kiko‡		1983	September 2–4	66 hours	145 mph (230 km/h)	Unknown	
Raymond† ‡		1983	October 11–15	42 hours	145 mph (230 km/h)	Unknown	
Tico		1983	October 19	6 hours	130 mph (215 km/h)	Unknown	
Douglas		1984	June 28–30	48 hours	145 mph (230 km/h)	Unknown	
Elida		1984	July 1	6 hours	130 mph (215 km/h)	Unknown	
Iselle		1984	August 8–9	12 hours	130 mph (215 km/h)	Unknown	
Norbert‡		1984	September 21–24	36 hours	130 mph (215 km/h)	Unknown	
Ignacio†		1985	July 23–24	24 hours	130 mph (215 km/h)	Unknown	
Jimena		1985	July 24	12 hours	130 mph (215 km/h)	Unknown	
Rick**		1985	September 8–10	42 hours	145 mph (230 km/h)	Unknown	
Estelle*		1986	July 20–21	36 hours	130 mph (215 km/h)	Unknown	
Javier‡		1986	August 25	12 hours	130 mph (215 km/h)	Unknown	
Roslyn		1986	October 18–20	42 hours	145 mph (230 km/h)	Unknown	
Max		1987	September 12–14	42 hours	155 mph (250 km/h)	Unknown	
Ramon		1987	October 9–10	36 hours	140 mph (220 km/h)	Unknown	
Hector		1988	August 2–4	36 hours	145 mph (230 km/h)	935 hPa (27.6 inHg)	
Fabio†		1988	August 3	12 hours	140 mph (220 km/h)	943 hPa (27.8 inHg)	
Octave		1989	September 13	6 hours	130 mph (215 km/h)	948 hPa (28.0 inHg)	
Raymond		1989	September 30 – October 1	30 hours	145 mph (230 km/h)	935 hPa (27.6 inHg)	
Hernan		1990	July 22–25	60 hours	155 mph (250 km/h)	928 hPa (27.4 inHg)	
Marie†		1990	September 11	24 hours	140 mph (220 km/h)	944 hPa (27.9 inHg)	
Odile		1990	September 26–27	36 hours	145 mph (230 km/h)	935 hPa (27.6 inHg)	
Trudy‡		1990	October 19–27	78 hours	155 mph (250 km/h)	924 hPa (27.3 inHg)	
Jimena‡		1991	September 23–26	48 hours	130 mph (215 km/h)	945 hPa (27.9 inHg)	
Kevin		1991	September 29 – October 2	72 hours	145 mph (230 km/h)	935 hPa (27.6 inHg)	
Celia		1992	June 27–28	42 hours	145 mph (230 km/h)	935 hPa (27.6 inHg)	
Estelle‡		1992	July 12–14	30 hours	140 mph (220 km/h)	943 hPa (27.8 inHg)	
Frank		1992	July 17–19	36 hours	145 mph (230 km/h)	935 hPa (27.6 inHg)	
Orlene		1992	September 5–7	60 hours	145 mph (230 km/h)	934 hPa (27.6 inHg)	
Iniki†		1992	September 11–12	24 hours	145 mph (230 km/h)	938 hPa (27.7 inHg)	
Tina		1992	September 29 – October 2	66 hours	150 mph (240 km/h)	932 hPa (27.5 inHg)	
Virgil		1992	October 3	6 hours	130 mph (215 km/h)	948 hPa (28.0 inHg)	
Dora		1993	July 16–17	24 hours	130 mph (215 km/h)	945 hPa (27.9 inHg)	
Fernanda		1993	August 11–13	42 hours	145 mph (230 km/h)	934 hPa (27.6 inHg)	
Keoni†		1993	August 16–17	24 hours	130 mph (215 km/h)	943 hPa (27.8 inHg)	
Greg		1993	August 19–20	30 hours	130 mph (215 km/h)	948 hPa (28.0 inHg)	
Jova		1993	September 1	12 hours	130 mph (215 km/h)	948 hPa (28.0 inHg)	
Kenneth		1993	September 10–12	36 hours	150 mph (240 km/h)	932 hPa (27.5 inHg)	
Lidia		1993	September 11	24 hours	150 mph (240 km/h)	930 hPa (27 inHg)	
Lane		1994	September 6–7	18 hours	130 mph (215 km/h)	948 hPa (28.0 inHg)	
Olivia		1994	September 25–26	24 hours	150 mph (240 km/h)	923 hPa (27.3 inHg)	
Adolph		1995	June 18	6 hours	130 mph (215 km/h)	948 hPa (28.0 inHg)	
Barbara‡		1995	July 10–14	60 hours	140 mph (220 km/h)	940 hPa (28 inHg)	
Juliette		1995	September 20–21	24 hours	150 mph (240 km/h)	930 hPa (27 inHg)	
Douglas**		1996	August 1–2	36 hours	130 mph (215 km/h)	946 hPa (27.9 inHg)	
Felicia		1997	July 19	18 hours	130 mph (215 km/h)	948 hPa (28.0 inHg)	
Jimena		1997	August 27–28	36 hours	130 mph (215 km/h)	948 hPa (28.0 inHg)	
Nora		1997	September 21	6 hours	130 mph (215 km/h)	950 hPa (28 inHg)	
Pauline‡		1997	October 7–8	12 hours	130 mph (215 km/h)	948 hPa (28.0 inHg)	
Blas		1998	June 25	24 hours	140 mph (220 km/h)	943 hPa (27.8 inHg)	
Estelle		1998	August 2	6 hours	130 mph (215 km/h)	948 hPa (28.0 inHg)	
Howard‡		1998	August 23–26	60 hours	150 mph (240 km/h)	932 hPa (27.5 inHg)	
Dora		1999	August 10–13	72 hours	140 mph (220 km/h)	943 hPa (27.8 inHg)	
Notes: † The storm noted formed or attained Category 4 status in the central Pacific basin but may have formed in the eastern Pacific basin; ‡ The storm noted attained Category 4 status more than once; * The storm noted was both a Category 4 in the eastern and central Pacific basins; ** The storm noted originated in the Atlantic basin, but later intensified into a Category 4 hurricane in the eastern Pacific basin; # Storms that attained Category 4 status at one point but intensified into Category 5 at a later time are not included.

=== 2000–2019 ===
In the years between 2000 and 2019, 51 Category 4 hurricanes formed within the confines of the eastern Pacific Ocean. A dagger (†) denotes that the storm temporarily weakened below Category 4 intensity during the specified period of time.

List of Category 4 Pacific hurricanes from 2000–2019
Storm name	Track	Season	Dates as a Category 4	Hours	Maximum sustained winds	Minimum pressure	Notes
Carlotta		2000	June 21–22	24 hours	155 mph (250 km/h)	932 hPa (27.5 inHg)	
Adolph		2001	May 28–29	30 hours	145 mph (230 km/h)	940 hPa (28 inHg)	
Juliette‡		2001	September 24–26	42 hours	145 mph (230 km/h)	923 hPa (27.3 inHg)	
Fausto		2002	August 24–25	24 hours	145 mph (230 km/h)	936 hPa (27.6 inHg)	
Ele		2002	August 29	6 hours	130 mph (215 km/h)	945 hPa (27.9 inHg)	
Howard		2004	September 2–3	18 hours	140 mph (220 km/h)	943 hPa (27.8 inHg)	
Javier		2004	September 13–15	54 hours	150 mph (240 km/h)	930 hPa (27 inHg)	
Kenneth		2005	September 18–19	18 hours	130 mph (215 km/h)	947 hPa (28.0 inHg)	
Daniel		2006	July 20–23	72 hours	150 mph (240 km/h)	933 hPa (27.6 inHg)	
John		2006	August 30	12 hours	130 mph (215 km/h)	948 hPa (28.0 inHg)	
Flossie		2007	August 11–13	60 hours	140 mph (220 km/h)	949 hPa (28.0 inHg)	
Norbert		2008	October 8	6 hours	130 mph (215 km/h)	945 hPa (27.9 inHg)	
Felicia		2009	August 5–7	36 hours	145 mph (230 km/h)	935 hPa (27.6 inHg)	
Jimena		2009	August 30 – September 1	60 hours	155 mph (250 km/h)	931 hPa (27.5 inHg)	
Adrian		2011	June 10	18 hours	140 mph (220 km/h)	944 hPa (27.9 inHg)	
Dora		2011	July 21–22	30 hours	155 mph (250 km/h)	929 hPa (27.4 inHg)	
Eugene		2011	August 3–4	18 hours	140 mph (220 km/h)	942 hPa (27.8 inHg)	
Hilary‡		2011	September 23–27	60 hours	145 mph (230 km/h)	942 hPa (27.8 inHg)	
Kenneth		2011	November 22–23	18 hours	145 mph (230 km/h)	940 hPa (28 inHg)	
Emilia		2012	July 10	12 hours	140 mph (220 km/h)	945 hPa (27.9 inHg)	
Amanda		2014	May 25–26	36 hours	155 mph (250 km/h)	932 hPa (27.5 inHg)	
Cristina		2014	June 12	18 hours	150 mph (240 km/h)	935 hPa (27.6 inHg)	
Iselle		2014	August 4–5	18 hours	140 mph (220 km/h)	947 hPa (28.0 inHg)	
Odile		2014	September 14	12 hours	140 mph (220 km/h)	918 hPa (27.1 inHg)	
Simon		2014	October 4	6 hours	130 mph (215 km/h)	946 hPa (27.9 inHg)	
Andres		2015	June 1	24 hours	145 mph (230 km/h)	937 hPa (27.7 inHg)	
Blanca‡		2015	June 3–6	24 hours	145 mph (230 km/h)	936 hPa (27.6 inHg)	
Dolores		2015	July 15	6 hours	130 mph (215 km/h)	946 hPa (27.9 inHg)	
Hilda†		2015	August 8	12 hours	140 mph (220 km/h)	946 hPa (27.9 inHg)	
Ignacio†		2015	August 29–30	24 hours	145 mph (230 km/h)	942 hPa (27.8 inHg)	
Jimena		2015	August 29 – September 1	84 hours	155 mph (250 km/h)	932 hPa (27.5 inHg)	
Kilo‡		2015	August 30–31	36 hours	140 mph (220 km/h)	940 hPa (28 inHg)	
Olaf*		2015	October 19–21	42 hours	150 mph (240 km/h)	938 hPa (27.7 inHg)	
Sandra		2015	November 26	18 hours	150 mph (240 km/h)	934 hPa (27.6 inHg)	
Blas		2016	July 6	6 hours	140 mph (220 km/h)	947 hPa (28.0 inHg)	
Georgette		2016	July 25	12 hours	130 mph (215 km/h)	952 hPa (28.1 inHg)	
Lester‡		2016	August 29–31	36 hours	145 mph (230 km/h)	944 hPa (27.9 inHg)	
Madeline†		2016	August 30	6 hours	130 mph (215 km/h)	950 hPa (28 inHg)	
Seymour		2016	October 25–26	24 hours	150 mph (240 km/h)	940 hPa (28 inHg)	
Fernanda‡		2017	July 14–16	30 hours	145 mph (230 km/h)	947 hPa (28.0 inHg)	
Kenneth		2017	August 21	6 hours	130 mph (215 km/h)	952 hPa (28.1 inHg)	
Aletta		2018	June 8	12 hours	140 mph (220 km/h)	943 hPa (27.8 inHg)	
Bud		2018	June 12	12 hours	140 mph (220 km/h)	943 hPa (27.8 inHg)	
Hector‡*		2018	August 5–10	96 hours	155 mph (250 km/h)	936 hPa (27.6 inHg)	
Norman‡		2018	August 30 – September 3	48 hours	150 mph (240 km/h)	937 hPa (27.7 inHg)	
Olivia		2018	September 7	6 hours	130 mph (215 km/h)	951 hPa (28.1 inHg)	
Rosa		2018	September 28	18 hours	150 mph (240 km/h)	936 hPa (27.6 inHg)	
Sergio		2018	October 4	24 hours	140 mph (220 km/h)	943 hPa (27.8 inHg)	
Barbara		2019	July 2–4	42 hours	155 mph (250 km/h)	930 hPa (27 inHg)	
Erick†		2019	July 30–31	12 hours	130 mph (215 km/h)	952 hPa (28.1 inHg)	
Kiko		2019	September 15	12 hours	130 mph (215 km/h)	950 hPa (28 inHg)	
Notes: † The storm noted formed or attained Category 4 status in the central Pacific basin but may have formed in the eastern Pacific basin; ‡ The storm noted attained Category 4 status more than once; * The storm noted was both a Category 4 in the eastern and central Pacific basins; ** The storm noted originated in the Atlantic basin, but later intensified into a Category 4 hurricane in the eastern Pacific basin; # Storms that attained Category 4 status at one point but intensified into Category 5 at a later time are not included.

=== 2020–present ===
Since 2020, 22 Category 4 hurricanes formed within the confines of the eastern Pacific Ocean. A dagger (†) denotes that the storm temporarily weakened below Category 4 intensity during the specified period of time.

List of Category 4 Pacific hurricanes from 2020–present
Storm name	Track	Season	Dates as a Category 4	Hours	Maximum sustained winds	Minimum pressure	Notes
Douglas*		2020	July 24	12 hours	130 mph (215 km/h)	954 hPa (28.2 inHg)	
Genevieve		2020	August 18	6 hours	130 mph (215 km/h)	950 hPa (28 inHg)	
Marie		2020	October 2–3	30 hours	140 mph (220 km/h)	945 hPa (27.9 inHg)	
Felicia		2021	July 16–18	48 hours	145 mph (230 km/h)	945 hPa (27.9 inHg)	
Linda		2021	August 14–15	12 hours	130 mph (215 km/h)	953 hPa (28.1 inHg)	
Darby		2022	July 11–12	24 hours	140 mph (220 km/h)	953 hPa (28.1 inHg)	
Orlene		2022	October 2	6 hours	130 mph (215 km/h)	954 hPa (28.2 inHg)	
Roslyn		2022	October 22–23	12 hours	130 mph (215 km/h)	954 hPa (28.2 inHg)	
Dora‡*		2023	August 3–10	132 hours	150 mph (240 km/h)	939 hPa (27.7 inHg)	
Fernanda		2023	August 14–15	12 hours	130 mph (215 km/h)	949 hPa (28.0 inHg)	
Hilary‡		2023	August 18–19	24 hours	140 mph (220 km/h)	940 hPa (28 inHg)	
Lidia		2023	October 10–11	6 hours	140 mph (220 km/h)	942 hPa (27.8 inHg)	
Norma		2023	October 19	12 hours	130 mph (215 km/h)	939 hPa (27.7 inHg)	
Gilma		2024	August 25	12 hours	130 mph (215 km/h)	949 hPa (28.0 inHg)	
Erick		2025	June 19	6 hours	140 mph (220 km/h)	944 hPa (27.9 inHg)	
Iona		2025	July 29	6 hours	130 mph (215 km/h)	956 hPa (28.2 inHg)	
Kiko† ‡*		2025	September 3–7	60 hours	145 mph (230 km/h)	945 hPa (27.9 inHg)	
Lala		2026	August 19	3 hours	130 mph (215 km/h)	947 hPa (28.0 inHg)	
Karina		2026	August 31 – September 3	72 hours	145 mph (230 km/h)	940 hPa (28 inHg)	
Odalys		2026	September 25	9 hours	130 mph (215 km/h)	946 hPa (27.9 inHg)	
Nolo		2026	September 28–29	27 hours	155 mph (250 km/h)	929 hPa (27.4 inHg)	
Simon		2026	October 10–11	39 hours	155 mph (250 km/h)	928 hPa (27.4 inHg)	
Notes: † The storm noted formed or attained Category 4 status in the central Pacific basin but may have formed in the eastern Pacific basin; ‡ The storm noted attained Category 4 status more than once; * The storm noted was both a Category 4 in the eastern and central Pacific basins; ** The storm noted originated in the Atlantic basin, but later intensified into a Category 4 hurricane in the eastern Pacific basin; # Storms that attained Category 4 status at one point but intensified into Category 5 at a later time are not included.

== Number by month ==
Only two Category 4 hurricanes have been recorded in May, in addition to 15 in June, 30 in July, 42 in August, 37 in September, 22 in October, and two in November. No Category 4 storms have developed during the off-season.

Number of recorded Category 4 Pacific hurricanes by month
Month	Number of hurricanes
May	2
June	15
July	30
August	42
September	37
October	23
November	2

== Landfalls ==
Landfalls by month
Month	Number of storms
June	2
August	3
September (Note: Though Hurricane Juliette of 2001 made a second landfall in October, it did so after it re-generated. The landfall is included in the "September" total but not the "October" total.)	10
October	18

Of the 151 Category 4 hurricanes that have formed in the eastern and central Pacific basins, 34 have made landfall. Of them, five made landfall at Category 4 and Category 3 intensity, thirteen at Categories 2 and 1, ten as tropical storms, and eight as tropical depressions. Several of these storms weakened slightly after attaining Category 4 status as they approached land; this is usually a result of dry air, shallower water due to shelving, cooler waters, or interaction with land.

Name	Year	Category 4	Category 3	Category 2	Category 1	Tropical storm	Tropical depression	Source(s)
Unnamed	1957	Sinaloa state	—	—	—	—	—	
Dot	1959	—	—	—	Kauaʻi	—	—	
"Mexico"	1959	Colima state	—	—	—	—	—	
Liza	1976	—	Sonora state	—	—	—	—	
Madeline	1976	Guerrero state	—	—	—	—	—	
Ignacio	1979	—	—	—	—	—	Michoacán state	
Raymond	1983	—	—	—	—	—	Maui, Oʻahu, Kauaʻi	
Tico	1983	—	Sinaloa state	—	—	—	—	
Norbert	1984	—	—	—	—	Baja California Sur state	—	
Roslyn	1986	—	—	—	Sinaloa state	—	—	
Raymond	1989	—	—	—	—	Baja California Sur state Sonora state	—	
Orlene	1992	—	—	—	—	—	Big Island	
Iniki	1992	Kauaʻi	—	—	—	—	—	
Virgil	1992	—	—	Michoacán state	—	—	—	
Lidia	1993	—	—	Sinaloa state	—	—	—	
Nora	1997	—	—	—	Baja California Sur state Baja California state	—	—	
Pauline	1997	—	—	Oaxaca state	—	—	—	
Juliette	2001	—	—	—	—	Baja California Sur state	Sonora state	
Javier	2004	—	—	—	—	—	Baja California Sur state	
John	2006	—	—	Baja California Sur state	—	—	—	
Norbert	2008	—	—	Baja California Sur state	Sonora state	—	—	
Jimena	2009	—	—	Baja California Sur state	—	—	—	
Iselle	2014	—	—	—	—	Big Island	—	
Odile	2014	—	Baja California Sur state	—	—	Sonora state	—	
Blanca	2015	—	—	—	—	Baja California Sur state	—	
Bud	2018	—	—	—	—	Baja California Sur state	—	
Olivia	2018	—	—	—	—	Maui, Lānaʻi	—	
Rosa	2018	—	—	—	—	—	Baja California state	
Sergio	2018	—	—	—	—	Baja California Sur state	Sonora state	
Orlene	2022	—	—	Islas Marías	Sinaloa state	—	—	
Roslyn	2022	—	Nayarit state	—	—	—	—	
Hilary	2023	—	—	—	—	Baja California state	—	
Lidia	2023	Jalisco state	—	—	—	—	—	
Norma	2023	—	—	—	Baja California Sur state	—	Sinaloa state	
Erick	2025	—	Oaxaca state	—	—	—	—	
Note: If a storm makes landfall in the same Mexican state more than once, it is only listed for the most intense landfall.

== See also ==
- List of Pacific hurricanes
- List of Category 4 Atlantic hurricanes
- List of Eastern Pacific tropical storms
- List of Category 1 Pacific hurricanes
- List of Category 2 Pacific hurricanes
- List of Category 3 Pacific hurricanes
- List of Category 5 Pacific hurricanes

== Footnotes ==
Notes

General

- Blake, Eric S.; Gibney, Ethan J.; Brown, Daniel P.; Mainelli, Michelle M.; Franklin, James L.; Kimberlain, Todd B.; Hammer, Gregory R. (June 2009). Tropical Cyclones of the Eastern North Pacific Basin, 1949–2006 (PDF). Historical Climatology Series. Vol. 6–5. Asheville, North Carolina: National Climatic Data Center. Archived (PDF) from the original on 2013-03-02.
- Longshore, David. (1998). Encyclopedia of hurricanes, typhoons, and cyclones (1st ed.). Facts on File, Inc. ISBN 0-8160-3398-6.

Specific
