= Hurricane Jimena (2009) =

Category 4 Pacific hurricane in 2009

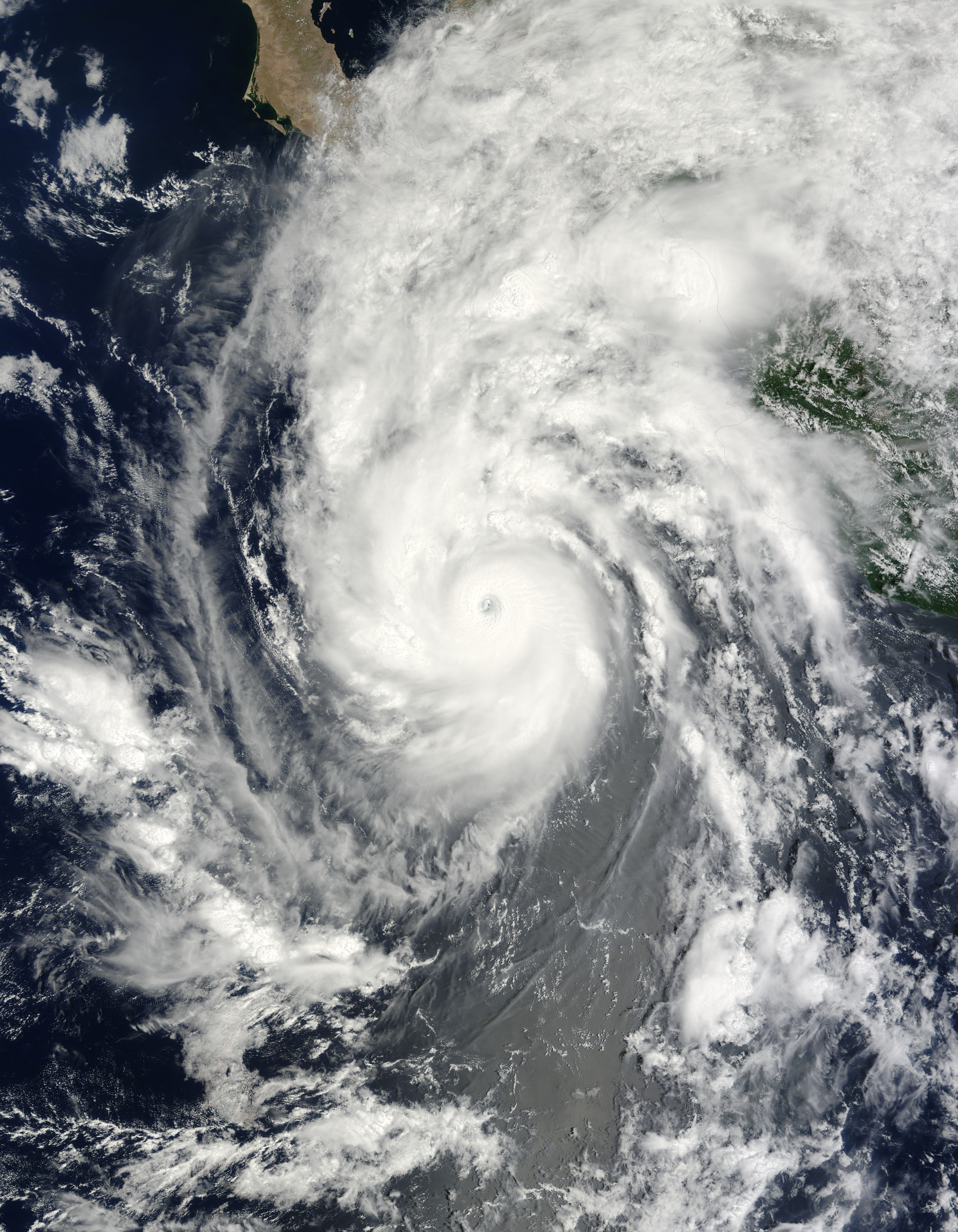
- Hurricane Jimena near peak intensity south of the Baja California Peninsula, on August 31

Meteorological history
- Formed: August 28, 2009
- Remnant low: September 4, 2009
- Dissipated: September 8, 2009

Category 4 major hurricane
- 1-minute sustained (SSHWS/NWS)
- Highest winds: 155 mph (250 km/h)
- Lowest pressure: 931 mbar (hPa); 27.49 inHg

Overall effects
- Fatalities: 5 direct, 2 indirect
- Damage: $211 million (2009 USD)
- Areas affected: Baja California Sur, Sonora, Southwestern United States
- IBTrACS /
- Part of the 2009 Pacific hurricane season

Hurricane Jimena /hiˈmɛnə/ is tied with Hurricane Norbert as the strongest tropical cyclone to make landfall on western portion of the Baja California Peninsula. Jimena was the twelfth named storm, fifth hurricane, third major hurricane and overall second-strongest tropical cyclone of the 2009 Pacific hurricane season. Forming from a tropical wave late on August 28, 2009, off of Mexico's Pacific coast, the system rapidly intensified into a Category 2 hurricane on the next day. Two days after developing, Jimena strengthened into a Category 4 hurricane. After peaking close to Category 5 intensity on September 1, it encountered cold water and began to weaken. When the hurricane made landfall on the Baja California Peninsula on September 3, it was only a Category 2 hurricane. On the next day, the tropical cyclone entered the Gulf of California, though the storm weakened into a remnant low after looping back eastward towards Baja California. The storm's remnants drifted westward into the Pacific afterward, before dissipating on September 8.

When the storm made landfall, Jimena caused US$173.9 million in damage. The system killed four people across the peninsula. In Baja California Sur, the town of Mulegé was devastated with other areas in the region also receiving major damage. In Sonora, record rainfall fell, with some areas receiving more than 20 in (510 mm). Statewide damage totaled at US$37 million while five people were killed and two others were listed as missing. The remnants of the storm also triggered thunderstorms in the Southwestern United States, causing minor damage.

== Meteorological history ==
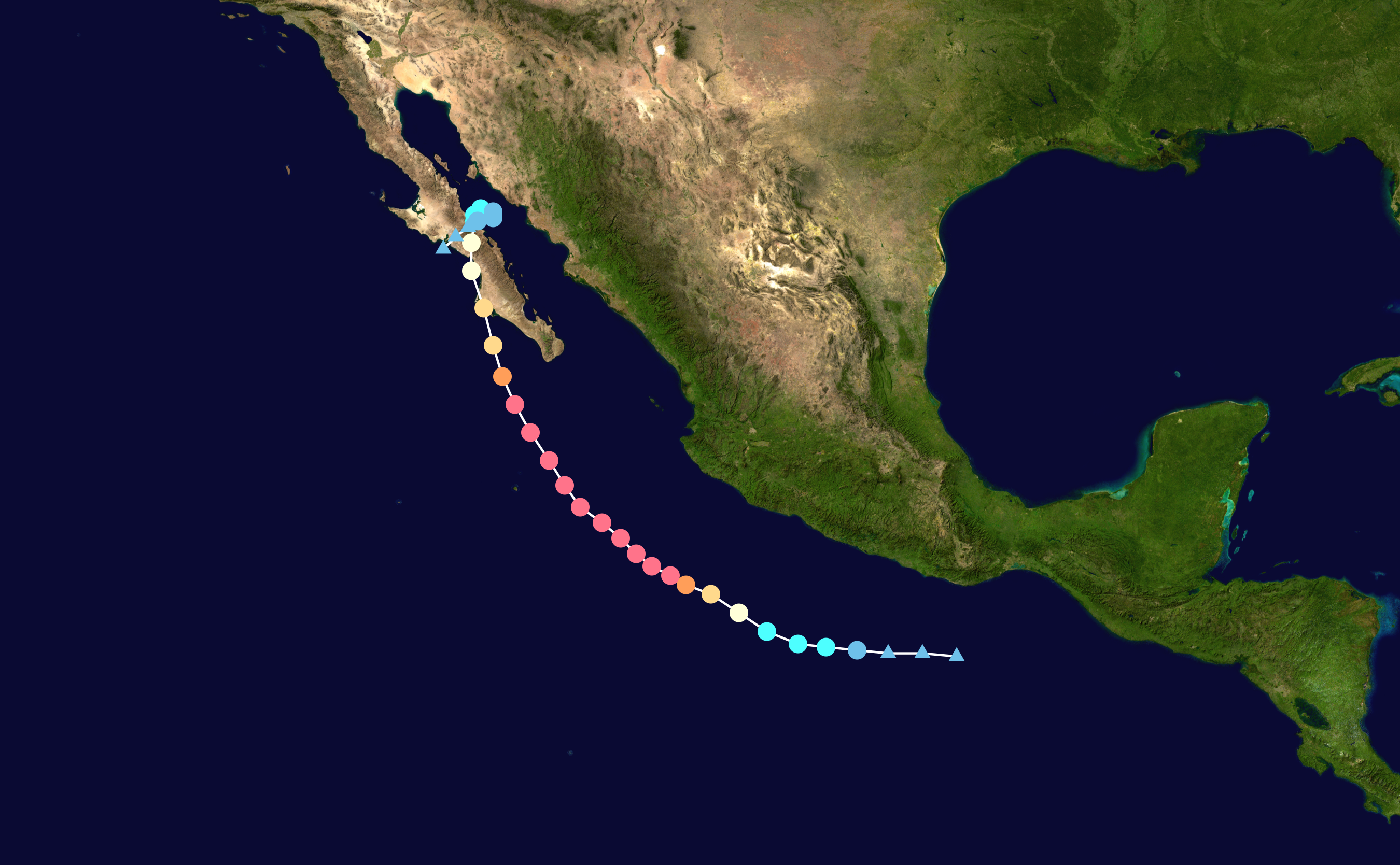
Map plotting the storm's track and intensity, according to the Saffir–Simpson scale Map key Saffir–Simpson scale Tropical depression (≤38 mph, ≤62 km/h) Tropical storm (39–73 mph, 63–118 km/h) Category 1 (74–95 mph, 119–153 km/h) Category 2 (96–110 mph, 154–177 km/h) Category 3 (111–129 mph, 178–208 km/h) Category 4 (130–156 mph, 209–251 km/h) Category 5 (≥157 mph, ≥252 km/h) Unknown Storm type Tropical cyclone Subtropical cyclone Extratropical cyclone, remnant low, tropical disturbance, or monsoon depression

Hurricane Jimena originated from a tropical wave that moved off the western coast of Africa on August 15. The tropical wave traversed the Atlantic Ocean with little or no convective development. On August 25, the National Hurricane Center began monitoring a broad area of low pressure, while the system was located over Central America. The system moved westbound and entered the eastern Pacific Ocean later that day. Initially, there were no signs of additional development. However, shower and thunderstorm activity began to increase and an area of low pressure developed within the wave on August 27. Around 1800 UTC on August 28, the low had become sufficiently organized for the National Hurricane Center (NHC) to designate the system as Tropical Depression Thirteen-E. Upon becoming a tropical cyclone, the depression was situated roughly 220 miles (350 km) south of Acapulco. Tracking westward in response to a mid-level ridge over Mexico, the depression intensified into a tropical storm on 0000 UTC August 29. In real time, however, it was not classified until early on August 29 while located 250 mi (400 km) west of Acapulco.

Tropical Storm Jimena featured only a small area of gale-force winds upon being named; however, the small size of the storm allowed for its subsequent intensification. Deep convection developed around the center of circulation and well-defined convective feeder band to the north. Rapid intensification began to take place early on August 29 as extremely deep convection developed and microwave satellite imagery depicted a developing eye feature within the center of the storm. Jimena turned towards the northwest by this time, and moved over very warm sea surface temperatures, averaging 86 °F (30 °C). The hurricane was upgraded to Category 2 intensity in the late evening hours on August 30, and was upgraded to the season's third major hurricane – a storm with winds of 111 mph (179 km/h) or greater – on the morning of August 30 when the eye became visible on satellite imagery. Continuing to intensify, it was upgraded to a Category 4 hurricane just six hours after becoming a major hurricane and 24 hours after becoming a tropical storm. Meanwhile, the eye became better defined.

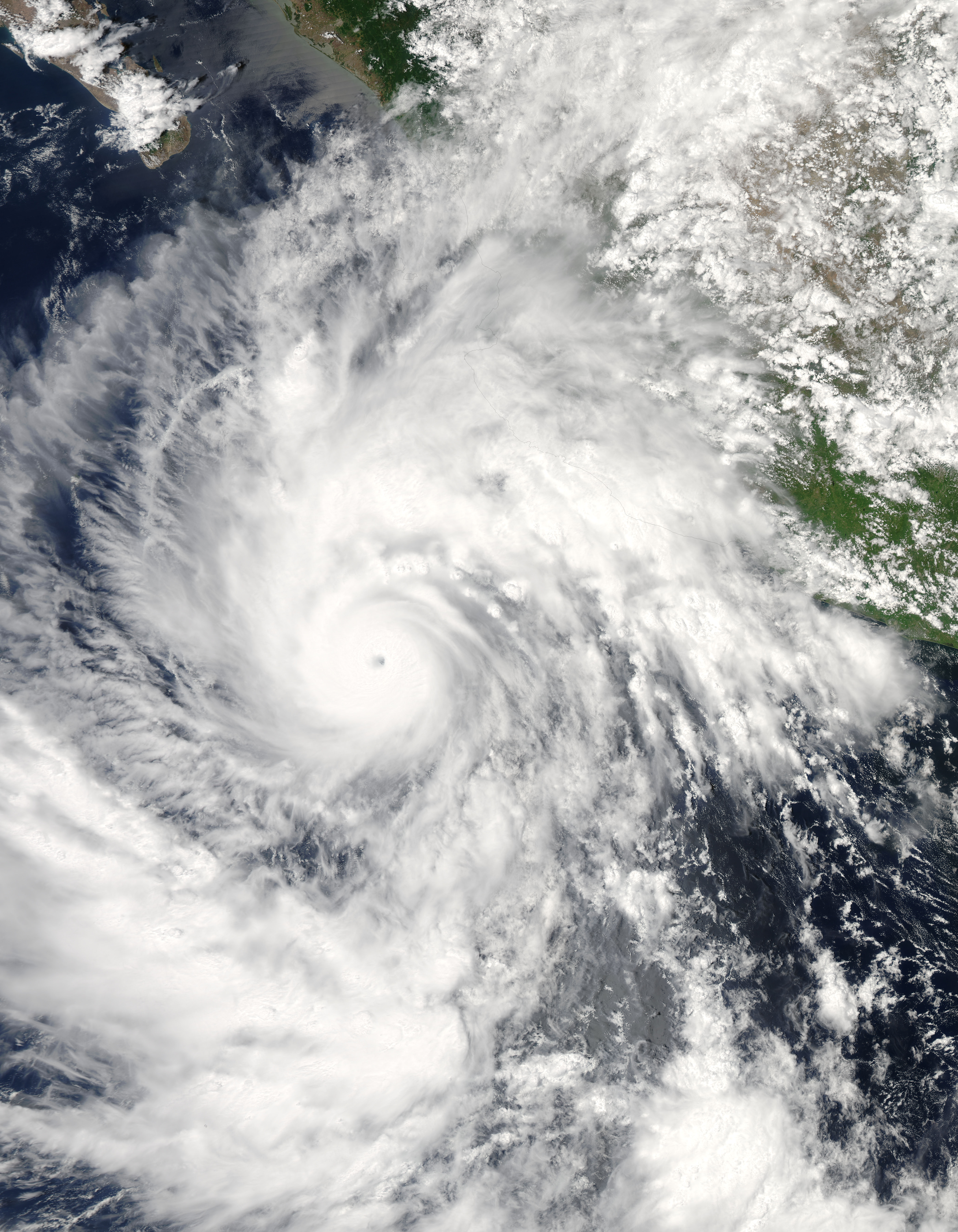
Hurricane Jimena intensifying to the southwest of Jalisco on August 30

Late on August 29, the cyclone leveled off in intensity as a mid-level Category 4 hurricane due to an eyewall replacement cycle, where one eye gets replaced by another. The cycle continued for another 24 hours, only to start another burst of intensification. By the evening of August 31, Hurricane hunters measured winds of 155 mph (249 km/h) and a pressure of 931 mbar (931 hPa; 27.5 inHg) while the powerful cyclone began to turn to the north due to nearby Tropical Storm Kevin and a low pressure area west of Baja California. Wind shear increased as the hurricane moved over progressively cooler water. Despite weakening slightly, Jimena was anticipated by meteorologists to still remain a major hurricane as the storm moved ashore. This did not occur and Jimena steadily weakened. On September 1, Hurricane hunters found Jimena weaker, reporting winds of 145 mph (233 km/h) and a pressure of 940 mbar (940 hPa; 28 inHg). About 12 hours after the flight, the winds of Jimena dropped below major hurricane intensity despite an increase of convection.

On 1200 UTC September 2, Jimena made landfall on Isla San Margarita, Baja California del Sur with winds of 105 mph (169 km/h) and a pressure of 971 mbar (971 hPa; 28.7 inHg). An hour later, Jimena made a second landfall (after re-entering the Pacific) at the same intensity near Cabo San Lázaro. It then moved over land, weakening into a Category 1 later that day, only to move back offshore as a Category 1 hurricane. The hurricane made a third landfall near San Junacio with 85 mph (137 km/h) winds. After its third landfall, Jimena returned to tropical storm status over land. After emerging into the Gulf of California, steering currents collapsed and increased wind shear continued to weaken Jimena. By late on September 3, Jimena was just a minimal tropical storm. It turned to the west, weakening into a tropical depression the next day. With winds of 30 mph (48 km/h), the system made a fourth and final landfall near Santa Rosalía, Baja California Sur. Within five hours, the tropical depression had degenerated into a remnant low. At midday on September 5, the remnant low had dissipated; however, the remnant circulation of Jimena continued to track westward into the Pacific for a few more days.

== Preparations ==
Upon Jimena crossing Central America, the NHC noted the possibility locally heavy rainfall spreading across much of Central America and in extreme Southwestern Mexico. As the storm moved parallel to the Mexican coast, interests in the region were asked to watch the progress of the system and officials in the area opened shelters due to the risk of high winds. The Sonora state government issued a blue (initial) alert for 14 municipalities on the southern portion of the state the afternoon of August 31. Later on the day, the blue alert was upgraded to a green alert, citing the risk of large rainfall amounts.

Early on August 31, about 54 hours prior to landfall, the Government of Mexico issued a hurricane watch from Bahía Magdalena to San Evaristo in Baja California Sur. A state of emergency was declared in five districts of Baja California Sur requested via the local government. In La Paz, residents rushed to get groceries before the stores closed and residents boarded up windows. In Los Cabos, residents frantically stocked up on supplies before the tropical cyclone struck. On August 31, civil defense authorities in Los Cabos announced that they would have to evacuate 20,000 families from their homes. Officials urged a total of 10,000 people to evacuate from shacks. Most people evacuated; however, they feared that there items would be stolen if they had left. While they did struggle with evacuations, officials managed to evacuate 15,000 people living in hurricane prone areas. However, many people such as tourists and the poor failed to evacuate, though 2,000 foreigners did leave the Los Cobos area. On August 30, Robbie Berg from the National Hurricane Center noted that the hurricanes remnants may help fire relief in California and also interests Baja California should monitor the progress of the system.

== Impact ==
=== Mexico ===
==== Southwestern Mexico ====
In Acapulco, the storm produced overcast skies, but ports in the area remained open. In addition, the states of Guerrero, Colima, and Jalisco suffered mudslides, landslides, and heavy rain from outer rainbands related to the system.

==== Baja California Sur ====
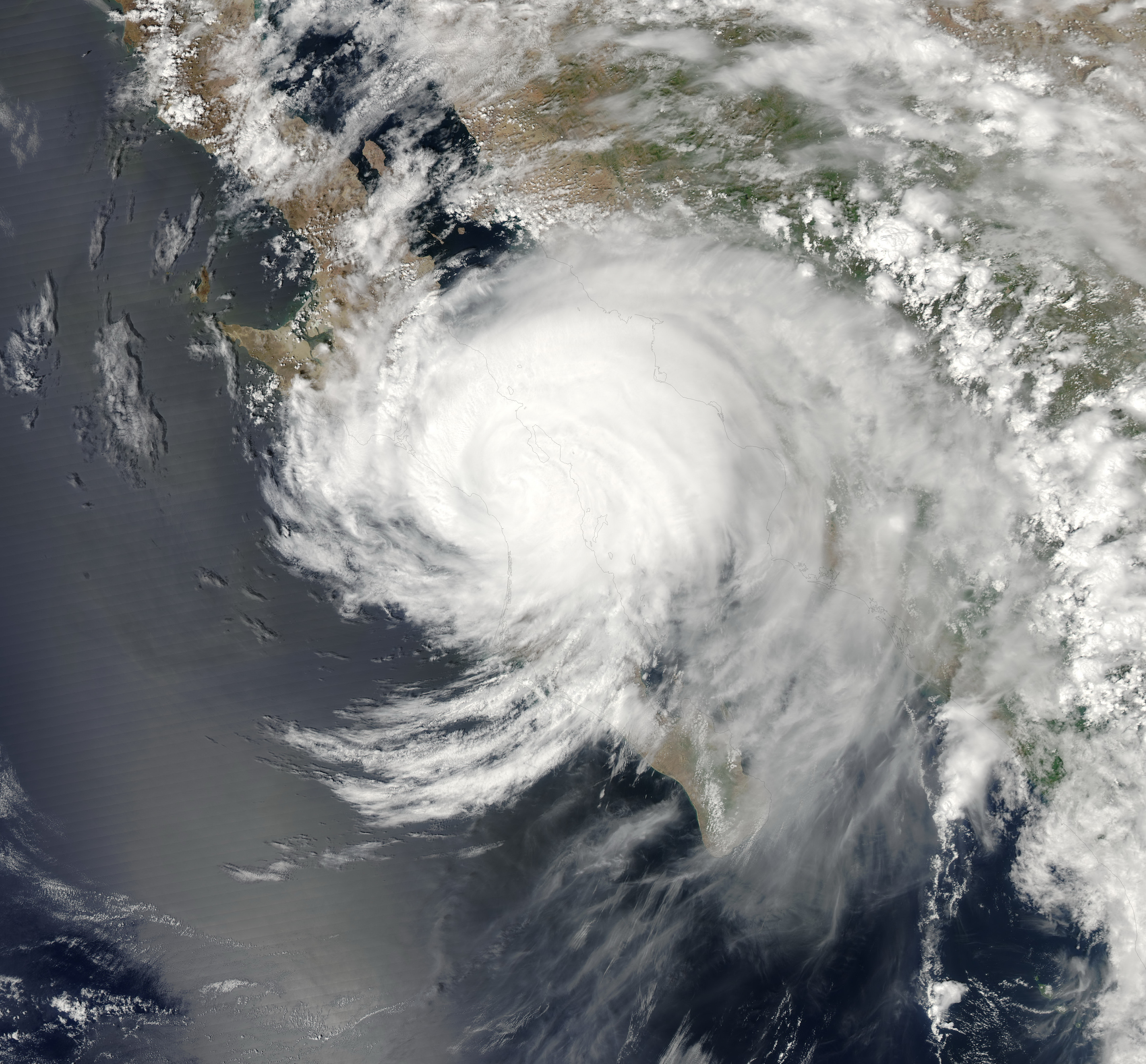
Hurricane Jimena over Baja California Peninsula on September 2

When the tropical cyclone passed over the Baja California Peninsula, storm chasers in Puerto San Carlos reported a minimum pressure of 973 mbar (973 hPa; 28.7 inHg). Ciudad Constitucion reported peak winds of 71 mph (114 km/h), with a peak gust of 90 mph (140 km/h), and a statewide peak of 13.12 in (333 mm). A secondary peak rainfall occurred at Santa Rosalía. However, no reports of storm surge or storm tide were received by the National Hurricane Center.

When the storm was over, Jimena's winds and heavy rain brought devastation across the Baja peninsula. One man was reported killed in Mulegé. Most of the homes and businesses there received extensive damage and water was 24 in (610 mm) deep. Damage there was considered worse than Hurricane John in 2006. One bridge in Mulege was under 6 ft (1.8 m) of water. The downtown area of Santa Rosalía was severely damaged with flash floods. Hurricane-force winds battered the area for hours before diminishing to 45 mph (72 km/h) the next day. Water supplies ran low and two bridges were washed out. In a nearby canyon, floodwaters washed out many cars and livestock.

In Cabo San Lucas, Jimena produced little damage. However, the entire town of Punta Chivato were flooded and damaged, with some being destroyed. In addition, 75% of homes were damaged in Puerto San Carlos, and power was lost in many areas including Comondú and Loreto. In the town of Puerto Lopez Mateos, half of the cannery buildings were destroyed and every wood home was destroyed, thus leaving a quarter of the population homeless. Nearby, the storm nearly destroyed two isolated villages, Punta Abreojos village and Laguna San Ignacio. Both areas got hit by Jimena at its first landfall. Although in Bahia Asuncion damages was minor, the villages of Abreojos and San Ignacio Lagoon were badly damaged. Seventy percent of the electric network form Santa Rosalía to Ciudad Constitución was damaged due to power outages. In both of the towns, the Mexican Red Cross branches received some damage. The roads from San José del Cabo to Tijuana was affected because any nearby creeks overflowed their banks. The airports in Los Cabos, La Paz and Loreto and ports were briefly closed, but were later re-opened after the storm passed since the airports received only minimal damage.

A total of 35,000 people were reported homeless and hit 29 transmission lines in the cities Cabo San Lucas, San José del Cabo, La Paz and Ciudad Constitución affecting 50,000 customers. The worst was in the former, with a total of 27,000 customers affected and 17 transmission lines. Severe damage also occurred in the agricultural sector; 400 hectares of citrus was lost, 80 hectares of greenhouses was destroyed. Losses in the sector were estimated to be at least MXN$500 million (US$37.3 million). Damages to infrastructure amounted to MXN$300 million (US$12.5 million). Total losses related to Hurricane Jimena reached 2.3 billion pesos ($173.9 million). Local water authorities reported that 14,000 people were waterless, because eight pipelines broke. The worst damage occurred in the aqueduct in Santa Rosalía. The officials estimated that the repair would cost about $652,224. A total of 72,000 people were affected and four people were reported dead.

==== Sonora ====
Jimena produced record rainfall in Sonora. By September 3, rainfall had reached 18 in (460 mm) and the state newspaper then noted the possible of a dam overflowing. A few days later, in Guaymas, rainfall from the storm had reached 21.92 in (557 mm), thus setting a state rainfall record. The peak 24-hour rainfall record was set by Jimena as it ultimately topped out at 26.1 in (660 mm) while 43.39 inches (110.2 cm) of rain was reported in 36 hours.

The towns of Guaymas and Empalme became unreachable from the rest of the state because Mexico Federal Highway 15 was closed due to flooding. Some river channels overflowed due to flooding. In addition, a total of 15 people were stuck on the roof of a middle school and was later rescued by air. A total of 775 people were evacuated in Bahia Kino, Guaymas, Navojoa, and Álamos. Major highways were impassable because of bridges that had washed out. The main highway in San Carlos was washed away due to flash floods. Marina Seca was badly damaged, with boats being washed out over the highway onto the beaches, where there was no water, telephone, or internet services for over 15 days. In all, the damages associated with Hurricane Jimena in Guaymas and San Carlos totaled over $37 million. More than 200,000 houses were destroyed or damaged so severely that people could not return to them for several months, mainly in the poorest areas. School was suspended for over two months in most areas. Hundreds of local stores were destroyed; over 2800 acres of farm land were severely damaged.

Due to the damage caused by the hurricane, a state of emergency was declared in southern Sonora. Two people died near Guaymas during a car accident; two others were reported missing. According to a report by Mexico's Centro Nacional de Prevención de Desastres, the magnitude of the event was analyzed to be a once in 2000 year occurrence.

=== United States ===
While the storm was weakening, a cold front lifted deep tropical moisture that triggered flash flooding and severe weather in the Mojave Desert. In San Diego County, California, a severe thunderstorm rolled through the area midday on September 5, breaking 19 pipelines and causing $100,000 in damage. Major flooding also occurred east of Barnwell on Ceader Canyon Road. South of Barnwell, hail and rainfall up to 1 in (25 mm) was reported. At the Nipton trading post, water and debris flowed on the roads. Flooding occurred on Interstate 15, forcing the local highway patrol to escort cars on to the highway while part of U.S. Highway 95 was closed for 2 hours, and 17 minutes. Near the town of Ocotillo Wells, flash flooding was reported due to heavy rainfall, causing an additional $20,000 in damage. Strong winds associated with the thunderstorms downed power lines and resulted in dust storms across the Imperial Valley, some of which reduced visibility by up to 25%.

In Valle Vista, Arizona, water, rock, and other debris covered many roads. In addition, several power lines were down at the Bullhead City Airport. Northwest of Golden Valley, severe thunderstorms produced golf ball sized hail, roughly 1.75 in (44 mm) in diameter, that broke windows. In Riviera, seven mobile homes were blown over by winds up to 80 mph (130 km/h), resulting in four injuries. North of Mohave Valley, mudslides destroyed two homes and damaged twenty-five others, resulting in roughly $600,000 in losses. Heavy Rain near Sedona caused flooding along Highway 179. In Quartzsite, Arizona, washes overflowed their banks, flooding nearby areas. In Tanca, about 1 in (25 mm) of rain fell in 30 minutes, resulting in flash flooding that washed out a road and damaged a business.

== Aftermath ==
Shortly after the hurricane made landfall, Mexico's natural disaster fund provided $1.45 million in aid to repair pipelines, highways, and buildings. The United Methodist Committee on Relief distributed food baskets to 720 survivors and provided 180 families with wood for rebuilding their homes. In addition, the Civil Protection Agency in Baja California, the Baja bush Pilots, and the Mexican Red Cross asked for donations of such as utensils, flashlights, lanterns, batteries, clothing, and light bedding. Following the hurricane, a riot in Santa Rosalía broke out due to lack of water. There was also a lack for shelter, as such this left many people sleeping in their cars. Within a week, the Mexican government assessed the damage form the hurricane, with 15 of them begin sent to Santa Rosalía and shortly thereafter, the Mexican Red Cross sent out relief efforts to the devastated area, especially in Santa Rosalía. A total of 4,460 food kits were sent, 1,152 hygiene kits, 765 cleaning kits, 225 children's kits, and 181 kitchen kits.

== See also ==
- Hurricane Odile
- Other tropical cyclones of the same name
- List of Category 4 Pacific hurricanes
- Hurricane Genevieve (2020)
