= Hurricane Norbert (1984) =

Category 4 Pacific hurricane in 1984

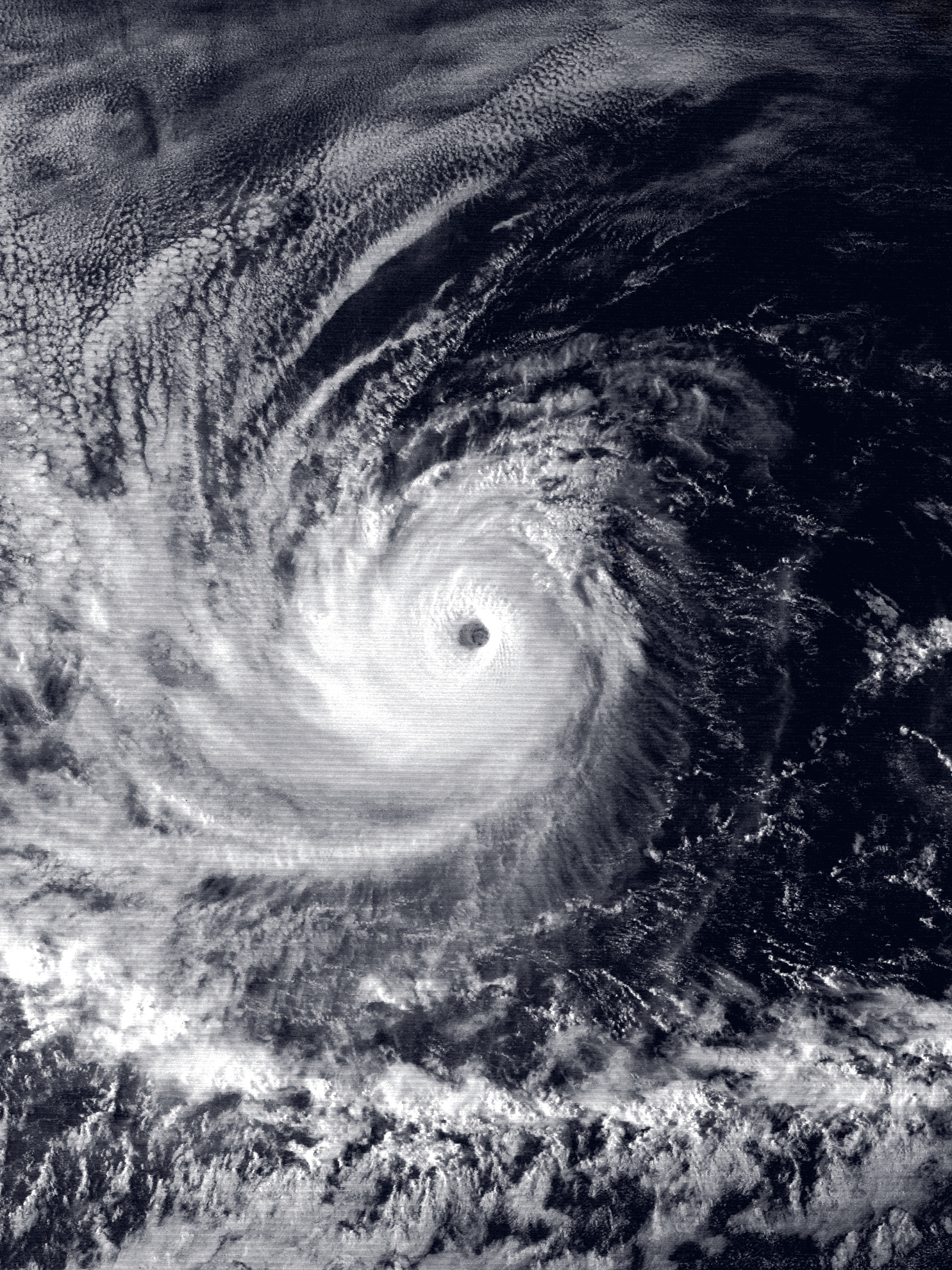
- Hurricane Norbert at peak intensity on September 21

Meteorological history
- Formed: September 14, 1984
- Dissipated: September 26, 1984

Category 4 major hurricane
- 1-minute sustained (SSHWS/NWS)
- Highest winds: 130 mph (215 km/h)

Overall effects
- Fatalities: 1 total
- Damage: $140 million
- Areas affected: Baja California Peninsula, Sonora, Arizona
- Part of the 1984 Pacific hurricane season

Hurricane Norbert was a powerful and erratic tropical cyclone that marked the first time a core of a hurricane was fully mapped in three-dimensions. First forming on September 14, 1984 west of the Mexican coast, Norbert gradually intensified, reaching hurricane intensity two days after formation. On September 22, Norbert peaked in strength as a Category 4 hurricane on the Saffir-Simpson Hurricane Scale. While intensifying, Norbert meandered. It moved east, then north, then west, then south, then back towards the east, and finally towards the northeast. After fluctuating in intensity for two more days, Norbert rapidly weakened. It turned towards the northwest and made landfall in southern Baja California Norte as a tropical storm. The combination of Norbert and several other storms left thousands homeless throughout Mexico. The remnants of Hurricane Norbert produced moderate rain over Arizona.

== Meteorological history ==
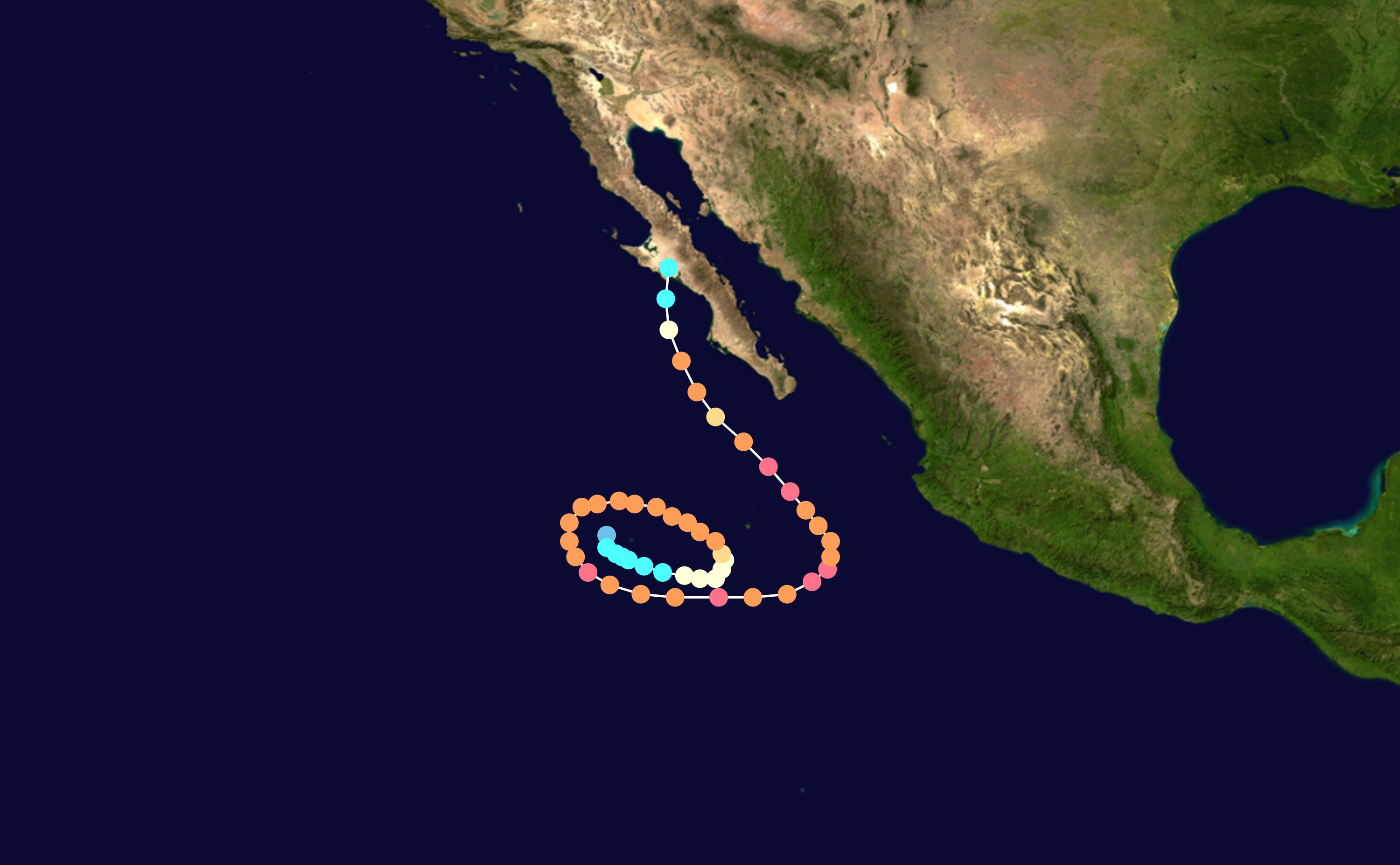
Map plotting the storm's track and intensity, according to the Saffir–Simpson scale Map key Saffir–Simpson scale Tropical depression (≤38 mph, ≤62 km/h) Tropical storm (39–73 mph, 63–118 km/h) Category 1 (74–95 mph, 119–153 km/h) Category 2 (96–110 mph, 154–177 km/h) Category 3 (111–129 mph, 178–208 km/h) Category 4 (130–156 mph, 209–251 km/h) Category 5 (≥157 mph, ≥252 km/h) Unknown Storm type Tropical cyclone Subtropical cyclone Extratropical cyclone, remnant low, tropical disturbance, or monsoon depression

A tropical depression first developed on September 14 over the Pacific Ocean west of the Mexican coast. Six hours later, the depression intensified into Tropical Storm Norbert. Gradually strengthening, Norbert meandered in the weak steering currents for several days. The rate of intensification accelerated early on September 16, and shortly thereafter Norbert became a hurricane.

On September 17, Norbert turned from the east to the north, and upon attaining Category 2 status on the Saffir–Simpson Hurricane Scale at 18:00 UTC the next day, Norbert began to turn back to the west. Several hours later, Norbert was upgraded to a major hurricane (Category 3 or higher). While maintaining its intensity for two and a half days, Norbert then turned to the south and after slight strengthening, back to the east. At 0000 UTC, September 21, Norbert reached its peak intensity of 130 mph (210 km/h). Meanwhile, a deep layer ridge over the Rocky Mountains was replaced by an upper-level trough, which extended south of Cabo San Lucas. This change in the steering patterns caused Hurricane Norbert to eventually turn to the northwest.

Norbert fluctuated in intensity; six hours after its peak Norbert weakened back into a Category 3 hurricane, only to regain Category 4 strength on three separate occasions during the next 48 hours. On September 23, a Hurricane Hunter aircraft was flown into Norbert and measured a 9.9 mi (15.9 km) eye and a closed eyewall. On September 24, while located 300 mi (480 km) south-southwest of Cabo San Lucas, Norbert re-intensified into a Category 4 hurricane for the fourth time. Another aircraft reconnaissance flew into the hurricane and observed that the heaviest precipitation was located on the eastern semicircle and that the storm's windfield was asymmetrical. Repeated penetrations were made into the eyewall, and scientists mapped a hurricane three-dimensional wind field for the first time.

Although the hurricane's motion accelerated, by 0000 UTC September 25, Norbert was only a mid-level Category 2 hurricane. Later that day, the third and final Hurricane Hunter aircraft flew into Hurricane Norbert, finding a larger eye than the first flight, with a diameter of 16 mi (26 km). After weakening back into a tropical storm early on September 26, the system moved ashore near Point Abreojos in the central portion of the Baja California Peninsula as a high-end tropical storm, where the EPHC ceased tracking the system. According to the National Weather Service office in Tucson, surface and satellite observations suggested that Norbert survived as a tropical depression over into Arizona. If Norbert had done so, it would have been one of the eight tropical cyclones to survive into the state.

== Preparations and impact ==
Due to the storm's large circulation, authorities in Mazaltan issued weather alerts to warn shipping "to exercise extreme caution" from Jalisco to Baja California Sur. The Eastern Pacific Hurricane Center noted the possibility of heavy rains and flooding across portions of the Baja California Peninsula. Under the anticipation of heavy rains in Arizona, flash flood watches were hoisted across several counties and some school districts near Tucson released students early owing to those concerns. However, flooding was not anticipated to be as severe as that from Tropical Storm Octave the previous year.

Scattered and light rainfall fell across portions of Baja California Norte, Sinaloa, and Sonora, with rainfalls totals of 2.38 in (60 mm) and 2.44 in (62 mm) at Bento Juarez and Denchiva-San Pendro respectively. In the small fishing communities of Punta Abreojos and La Bocana along the coastline, 90% of structures were demolished, which resulted in 4,000 homeless individuals. One person was killed and more than US$140 million in damage occurred there. Initially, nine fisherman were reported missing, but eight of the nine were later safely found. As a result of Norbert and a combination of other storms that hit the country in 1984, crop losses were estimated at US$60 million, (Note: All damage totals are in 1984 values of their respective currencies.) mostly from corn, beans, wheat, rice and sorghum.

The remnants of Norbert produced sustained winds of 20 to 30 mph (30 to 50 km/h) across the Tucson metropolitan area. Due to its rapid motion, only moderate rainfall occurred throughout south-central to northeast Arizona, with most locations reporting between 1 and 2 in (25 and 51 mm) of rain. However, Kitt Peak reported a 30-hour storm rainfall total of 4.15 in (105 mm). Three people including an elderly man and a 10-year-old boy were rescued from a Tucson wash inundated with 5 to 6 ft (1.5 to 1.8 m) of water. About 50 roads were closed in Pima County, including 30 in Tucson. Across southwestern New Mexico, flash flood warnings were posted due to heavy rainfall. The rains extended as far west as Texas, where more than 3 in (76 mm) fell; these rains caused flooding in Abilene.

== See also ==
- 1984 Pacific hurricane season
- List of Pacific hurricanes
- Other cyclones named Norbert
- List of Category 4 Pacific hurricanes
