= Hurricane Iselle =

Category 4 Pacific hurricane in 2014

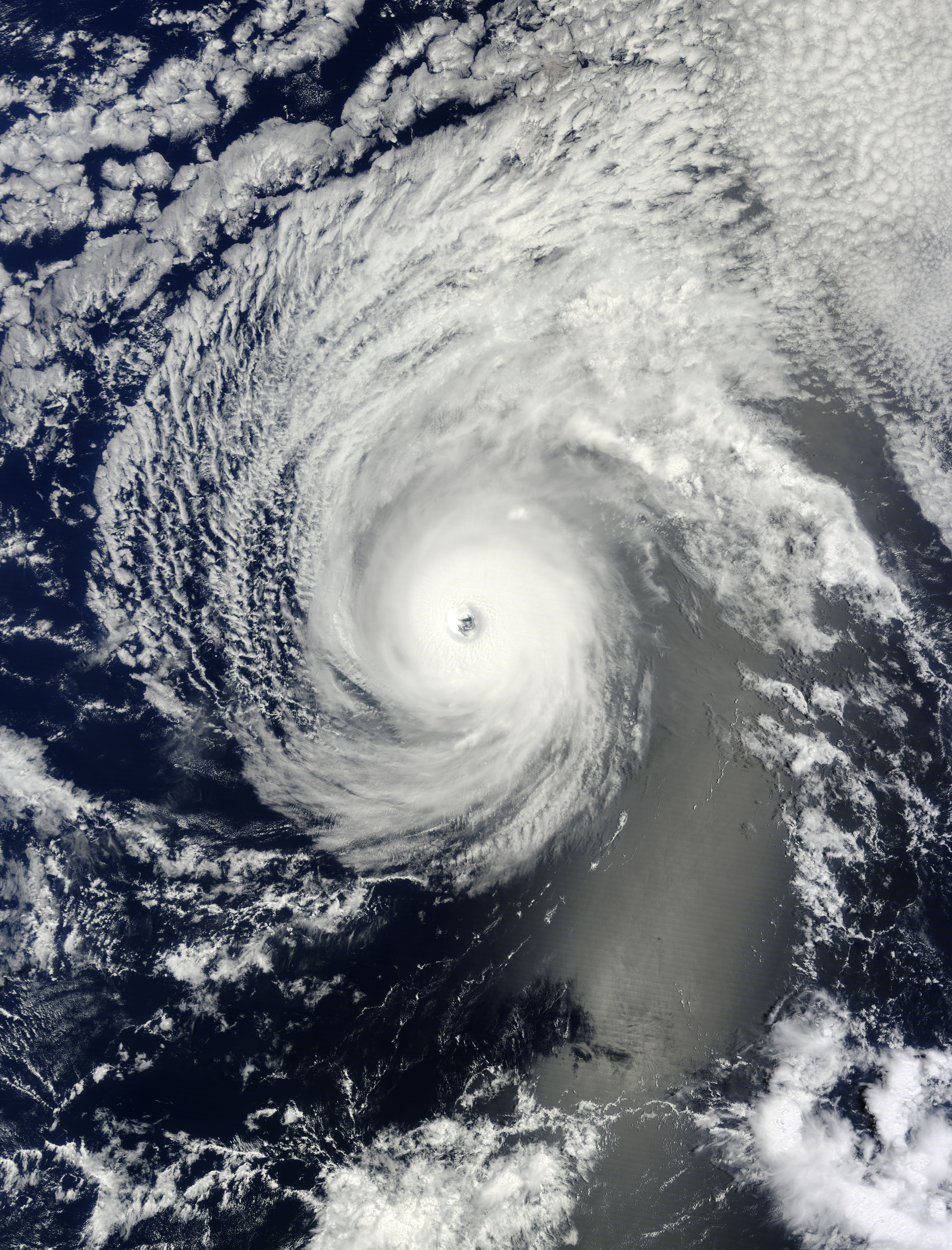
- Hurricane Iselle at peak intensity with annular characteristics on August 4

Meteorological history
- Formed: July 31, 2014
- Dissipated: August 11, 2014

Category 4 major hurricane
- 1-minute sustained (SSHWS/NWS)
- Highest winds: 140 mph (220 km/h)
- Lowest pressure: 947 mbar (hPa); 27.96 inHg

Overall effects
- Fatalities: 1 direct
- Damage: $148 million (2014 USD)
- Areas affected: Hawaii
- IBTrACS
- Part of the 2014 Pacific hurricane season

Hurricane Iselle was a tropical cyclone that made landfall on the island of Hawaii. The tenth named storm, fifth hurricane, and fourth major hurricane of the 2014 hurricane season, Iselle developed from an area of disturbed weather southwest of Mexico on July 31, 2014. Assuming a west-northwest course that it would maintain throughout its existence, generally favorable atmospheric conditions allowed for gradual strengthening, with the cyclone attaining hurricane status a day after formation. Continued strengthening progressed for several days up until August 4, when Iselle reached peak intensity with maximum sustained winds of 140 mph (220 km/h) and a minimum barometric pressure of 947 mbar (hPa; 27.96 inHg), making it a Category 4 hurricane. Thereafter, Iselle encountered hostile environmental conditions and quickly weakened before making landfall on the Big Island on August 8 as a moderate tropical storm. Its passage over the island disrupted the cyclone, and Iselle later dissipated on August 9.

Widespread precautionary measures took place across Hawaii as forecasts indicated the potential for a Hawaiian landfall as early as August 2. Then-governor Neil Abercrombie signed an emergency proclamation into effect, and numerous government facilities were closed. Several airlines cancelled flights servicing the archipelago. Upon making landfall, Iselle brought torrential rainfall and caused strong winds which resulted in widespread power outages and downed trees. The storm caused heavy crop damage, estimated at $79.2 million (2014 USD), including 60% of the state's papaya that was lost. This was enough to be classified as an agriculture disaster, and was eventually declared a disaster by Federal Emergency Management Agency after initially being denied. The storm also killed one person on Kauai as a result of flooding.

== Meteorological history ==
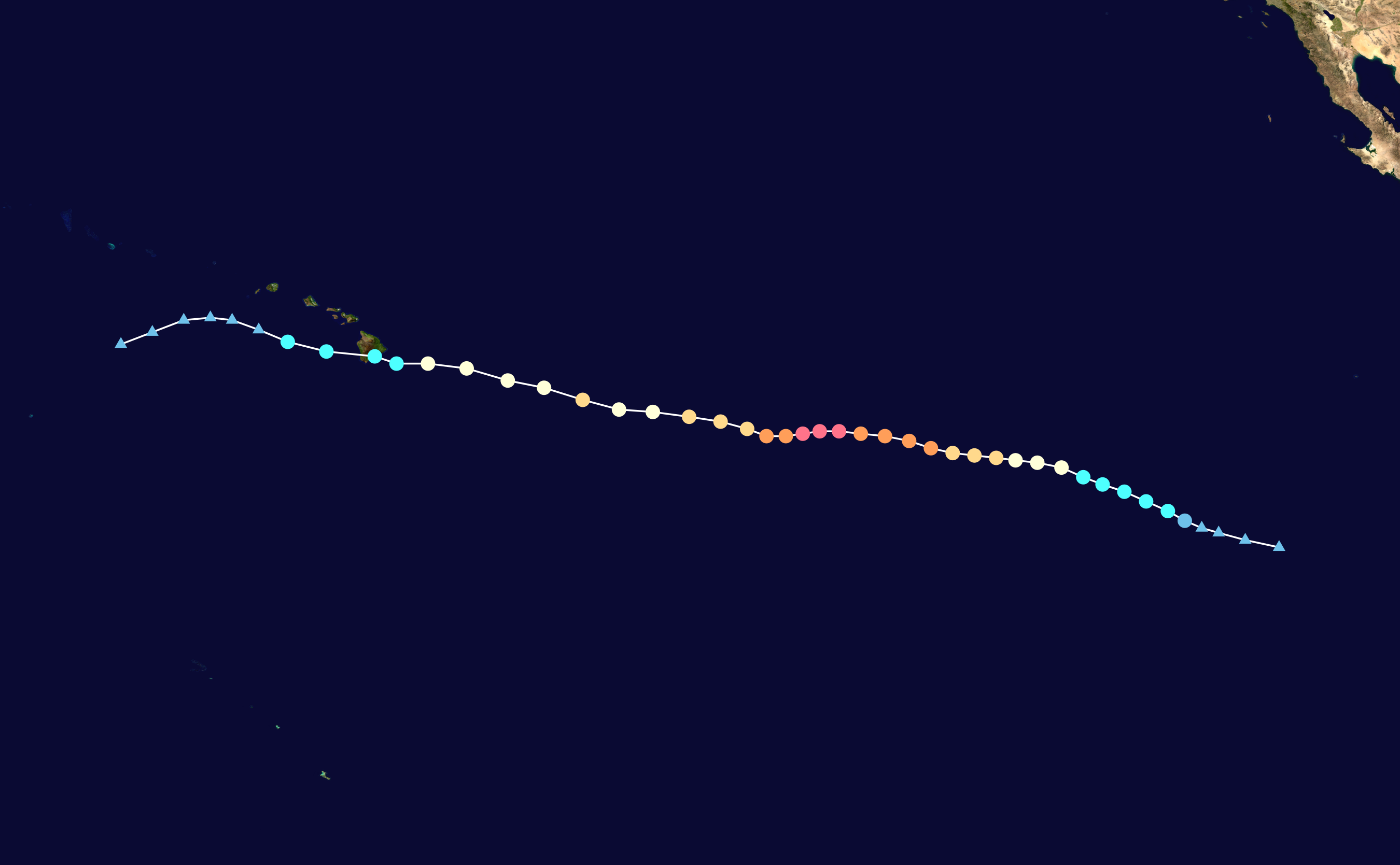
Map plotting the storm's track and intensity, according to the Saffir–Simpson scale Map key Saffir–Simpson scale Tropical depression (≤38 mph, ≤62 km/h) Tropical storm (39–73 mph, 63–118 km/h) Category 1 (74–95 mph, 119–153 km/h) Category 2 (96–110 mph, 154–177 km/h) Category 3 (111–129 mph, 178–208 km/h) Category 4 (130–156 mph, 209–251 km/h) Category 5 (≥157 mph, ≥252 km/h) Unknown Storm type Tropical cyclone Subtropical cyclone Extratropical cyclone, remnant low, tropical disturbance, or monsoon depression

In late July 2014, computer models began to indicate the possible formation of a low-pressure area off the coast of southwestern Mexico, prompting the National Hurricane Center (NHC) to assess the region with a low probability of tropical cyclogenesis on July 24. These forecasts began to come to fruition on July 28 when an area of thunderstorms associated with a tropical wave developed off the Mexican coast. Tracking westward in favorable conditions, the system organized over the following days. A tropical depression formed by 12:00 UTC on July 31. Six hours later, the NHC upgraded the depression to Tropical Storm Iselle due to the system's organization and the detection of tropical storm-force winds by the MetOp-B scatterometer. At the time, Iselle was located roughly 1,075 mi (1,730 km) southwest of the southern tip of the Baja California peninsula. Steady intensification continued after formation, with the NHC indicating the possibility of rapid intensification. On August 1, Iselle began to develop an eye, and this progressive pattern of organization prompted the NHC to upgrade the storm to hurricane status at 00:00 UTC the following day.

Although favorable conditions allowed for the uninhibited growth of Iselle early in its development, moderate wind shear briefly impacted the hurricane on August 2, preventing thunderstorms from intensifying and causing the storm to become slightly malformed vertically. However, these conditions abated shortly afterwards, allowing Iselle to resume strengthening and reach Category 2 hurricane status late that same day. With wind shear no longer impinging on the organization of Iselle, the tropical cyclone gradually became more symmetric, allowing for the hurricane's once ragged eye to clear itself of cloud cover and the storm to intensify to major hurricane status on August 3. Attaining some annular tropical cyclone characteristics, Iselle reaching Category 4 strength at 12:00 UTC on August 4. Consequently, Iselle reached peak intensity at 18:00 UTC with maximum sustained winds of 140 mph (220 km/h) and a minimum barometric pressure of 947 mbar (hPa; 27.96 inHg). At the same time, the hurricane exhibited an eye 30 mi (45 km) across.

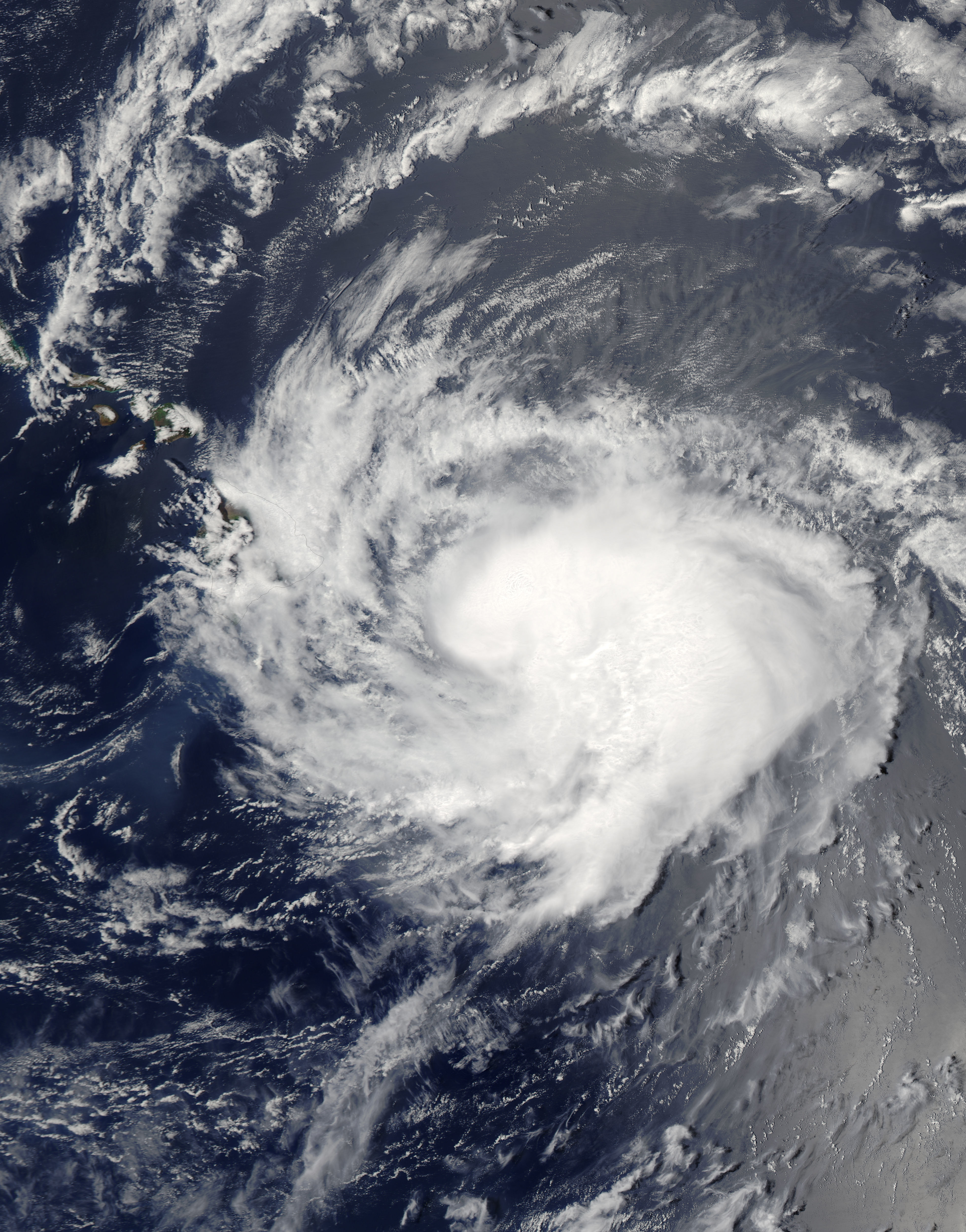
A weakening Hurricane Iselle approaching Hawaii on August 7

Following peak intensity, the combination of increasing wind shear and lowering sea surface temperatures began to slowly weaken Iselle, bringing it below Category 4 intensity early on August 5. Continued wind shear caused the storm to further degrade and its eye to become ragged in appearance. The NHC downgraded Iselle below major hurricane intensity at 18:00 UTC that day. At 00:00 UTC on August 6, forecasting responsibility transferred from the NHC to the Central Pacific Hurricane Center (CPHC). Although wind shear began to decrease thereafter, abundant dry air caused Iselle to rapidly weaken, dropping to Category 1 intensity on August 6. However, the suppressed wind shear allowed for the hurricane to reorganize and maintain a large eye as it tracked towards Hawaii, and Iselle reached its secondary peak intensity with winds of 100 mph (155 km/h) at 00:00 UTC on August 7. On August 7, the upper-level trough to the north caused an increase in wind shear, the storm's eye had faded and the CPHC estimated that Iselle had weakened to a minimal hurricane. Strong wind shear disrupted the system, and Iselle weakened to a tropical storm the next day before making landfall at 12:30 UTC along the Kau coast of the Big island with winds of 60 mph (95 km/h). The mountainous terrain of the island largely disrupted the main cyclonic circulation of Iselle, which manifested as a collection of small vortices south of the Hawaiian islands. Due to the loss of any sustained thunderstorm activity at the storm's center, the CPHC decided to downgrade Iselle to a remnant area of low pressure on August 9; at the time, the disturbance was centered roughly 200 mi (320 km) west-southwest of Honolulu. Iselle's remnant low dissipated two days later.

== Preparations ==
Infrared satellite loop of Tropical Storm Iselle impacting Hawaii on August 8

At 21:00 UTC on August 5, the CPHC issued a tropical storm watch for the island of Hawaii; forecasts issued by the NHC as early as August 2 illustrated the possibility of Iselle tracking over or in the vicinity of the Hawaiian archipelago. As the hurricane tracked closer to the islands, watches were extended as far westward as Oahu. The first hurricane warning associated with Iselle was issued on August 6 for Hawaii County. Later that day, a tropical storm warning was issued for Maui, Molokai, Lanai, Kahoolawe, and Oahu. By early on August 7, the tropical storm warning was extended to include Kauai, placing all of the main Hawaiian islands under some form of tropical cyclone warning. The potential for flooding also resulted in the issuance of a flash flood watch for the entirety the island chain. By August 9, all warnings were lifted as Iselle no longer posed a threat to the islands.

In anticipation for the potential impacts of both Iselle and Hurricane Julio, Hawaii governor Neil Abercrombie signed an emergency proclamation, thereby allocating resources to future relief and mitigation operations. Maui County mayor Alan Arakawa issued a state of emergency for his respective county. Due to the impending threat of the storm, the heightened sense of urgency prompted residents to stock up on necessities. Although no mandatory evacuation was planned, residents of low-lying areas in Hawaii County were requested to evacuate due to the threat of storm surge and flooding. Residents in coastal Kau and Puna districts were advised to take precautions and evacuate to higher ground if necessary. The United States Coast Guard urged boaters and mariners to exercise caution as waves were expected to reach 10–15 ft (3.0–4.6 m) in some offshore locations. The Coast Guard also prepared to partially close ports in both Hawaii and Maui County.

In Maui County, the Hawai'i Department of Education ordered for the closure of all schools and the designation of some facilities as emergency shelters. All public schools in Hawaii County were also closed by the department. Both the University of Hawaii and the Hawaii Community College closed their campuses during Iselle's passage. The Hawai'i Department of Land and Natural Resources closed all of its managed lands in Hawaii and Maui counties and closed some of its campgrounds and wilderness areas in Oahu and Kauai counties. All state offices and courthouses in Hawaii County were closed with the retention of only essential staff. Although Hawaiian Airlines did not cancel its flights, the company waived fees for passengers seeking to change from flights expected to service during Iselle's passage. United Airlines and Island Air later took the same accommodative measures. The latter later cancelled all of its inter-Hawaiian flights on August 7, with the exception of flights serving Kauai; American Airlines and numerous other airlines would follow suit as the threat of Iselle neared. The Salvation Army readied its resources in preparation for relief operations for Iselle in Hawaii.

== Impact ==
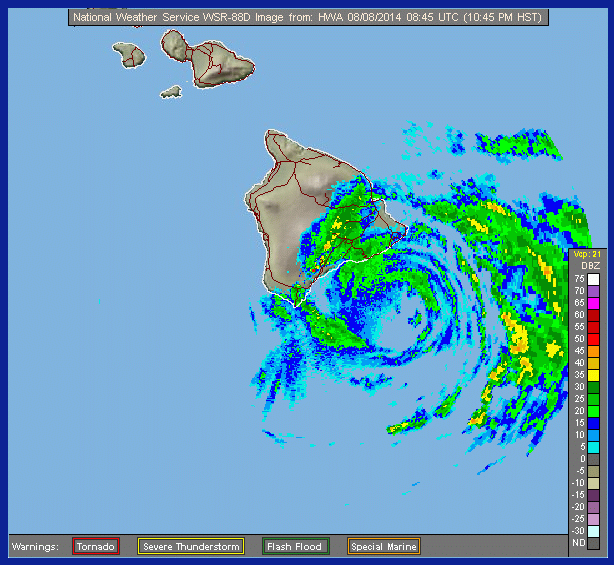
Radar image of Iselle shortly before landfall on August 8

Tropical storm-force winds affected much of the state as Iselle moved through, except Niihau, the rest of the Hawaiian Islands all reporting gusts over 39 mph (63 km/h). Hurricane-force winds were confined to Mauna Kea on the Big Island, where a peak gust of 91 mph (146 km/h) was observed. Heavy rains affected most of the southern islands, with some areas of the Big Island seeing more than 12 in (300 mm) due to orographic lift from the southerly flow on the backside of Iselle. The greatest total was at the Hakalau Forest National Wildlife Refuge, where 15.25 in (387 mm) was observed. Areas on the leeward side of the island saw substantially less rain; Kona International Airport received only 0.04 in (1.0 mm) during the storm's passage. Kauai saw rains in excess of 6 in (150 mm) in several areas and a maximum of 9.58 in (243 mm) at a United States Geological Survey station along the Kilohana Ridge. Totals peaked at 4.22 in (107 mm) to the north on Oahu, while Molokai and Lanai received generally negligible totals. Swells from hurricanes Iselle and Julio also produced 6 to 10 ft (1.8 to 3.0 m) waves along the eastern shores of the Hawaiian islands.

Iselle brought damaging surf along the east coast of the island. Strong winds unroofed homes near Hilo and downed trees. These winds also felled power lines, causing widespread outages impacting roughly 23,000 electricity customers. A geothermal plant in Puna released toxic hydrogen sulfide gases upon losing its power sources, prompting officials to urge an exodus of the immediate area, although a number of nearby residents reported health impacts. A water treatment plant in Kula on Maui also shut down due to power failure, prompting the conservation of water supplies in that area. Iselle's winds also damaged about 1,000 coffee trees and over 2,000 macadamia trees. Damage was heaviest to the papaya crop, with about 60% of the statewide crop destroyed, accounting for $55 million in losses (2014 USD). Other crops, including coffee, macadamia nuts, and flowers, were also damaged, and overall crop losses in the state were estimated at $66 million. Only one known death took place as a direct result of the storm – a 19-year-old woman who was swept away by flood waters while hiking in a closed state park. Over 250 property owners reported damage, with at least 11 houses destroyed, and 28 with major damage. Public damage and the cost to remove debris was estimated at $13.2 million. Total monetary losses in the State of Hawaii range between $148 million and $325 million.

Due to the threat from Iselle, lieutenant governor candidate Warner Sutton requested that Governor Neil Abercrombie postpone the August 9 primary. The governor declined the request, and the primary election occurred as scheduled. However, the storm damaged roads leading to two polling stations on the Big Island, prompting officials to decide the election by absentee ballot in those areas. After a close campaign between incumbent Senator Brian Schatz and Congresswoman Colleen Hanabusa, the senate primary, held on the same day as the gubernatorial primary, was too close to call after Schatz led by only 1,635 votes. As a result, the election hinged on the two closed polling stations, where more than 8,000 people had the option to vote by mail. This was later changed to an in-person vote for August 15, despite a challenge from the Hanabusa campaign with regards to storm damage, and Schatz ultimately won. The Hawaii American Civil Liberties Union later sued the state over how they handled the election.

== Aftermath ==
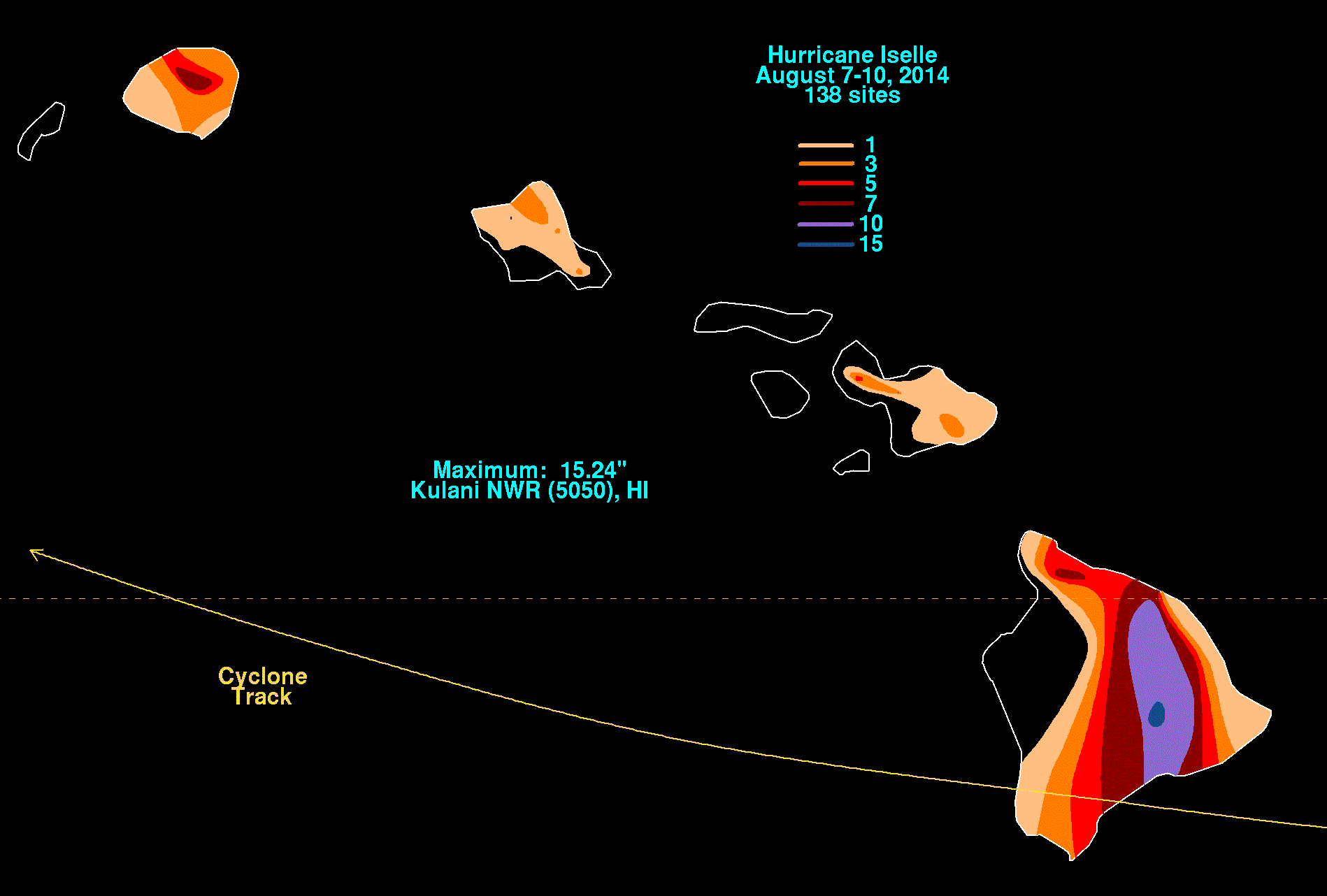
Rainfall map for Hurricane Iselle in Hawaii

After the storm, Hawaiian Electric Industries worked to restore power across the Big Island, aided by trucks removing trees and debris from roads. By August 20, 99% of customers had their power restored, leaving 1,100 residents by 12 days after the storm. However, it took until September 11, or about five weeks after the storm, for all power to be restored. Post-storm surveys indicated that the damage from Iselle was mostly related to trees that were not native to the island, which weakened and snapped under the high winds. Residents across Hawaii donated over $80,000 after the storm to assist victims, organized through the Hawaii Island United Way. Local charities distributed 5,000 lb (2,300 kg) of food to over 3,000 families.

The Federal Emergency Management Agency (FEMA) completed a disaster survey of houses on August 19, a first step toward a federal disaster declaration. Due to the damage, Congresswoman Tulsi Gabbard remarked, "I'm urging FEMA, Hawaii County, the governor and President Obama to expedite the process of declaring Iselle's devastation a natural disaster so that the people of Puna can receive immediate help." On August 25, Governor Abercrombie formally requested for federal assistance, after the state depleted its disaster fund, but that was rejected by FEMA due to insufficient damage. However, Agriculture Secretary Tom Vilsack declared an agriculture disaster, prompting the Small Business Administration to allow federal disaster loans to small businesses. The FEMA decision was reversed on September 12, when the federal government approved aid for rebuilding public buildings, as well as future disaster mitigation.

== See also ==
- Hurricane Gil (1983) – Skirted north of Hawaii, causing widespread power outages, gusty winds, and heavy rain
- Hurricane Estelle (1986) – Passed south of Hawaii, produced high waves
- Hurricane Daniel (2006) – Long-lived and annular hurricane whose remnants brought minor flooding to Hawaii
- Tropical Storm Flossie (2013) – Tracked near the Hawaiian islands from the east, bringing stormy conditions
- Hurricane Darby (2016) – Made landfall as a weaker tropical storm in the same area as Iselle, just two years later
- Hurricane Olivia (2018) – Made landfall on the islands of Maui and Lanai as a tropical storm
