= List of storms named Jimena =

The name Jimena has been used for eight tropical cyclones in the Eastern Pacific Ocean.

- Tropical Storm Jimena (1979) – late-season storm that formed at an unusually low latitude
- Hurricane Jimena (1985) — Category 4 hurricane that remained at sea
- Hurricane Jimena (1991) — Category 4 hurricane that also remained at sea
- Hurricane Jimena (1997) — Category 4 hurricane that formed before crossing into the Central Pacific
- Hurricane Jimena (2003) — a Category 2 hurricane that passed south of Hawaii as a tropical storm
- Hurricane Jimena (2009) — strong Category 4 hurricane that became one of the strongest to strike the Baja California Peninsula
- Hurricane Jimena (2015) — strong Category 4 hurricane that crossed into the Central Pacific, dissipated north of Hawaii
- Tropical Storm Jimena (2021) – weak storm that spent most of its lifetime as a tropical depression
