= List of storms named Norbert =

The name Norbert has been used for six tropical cyclones in the Eastern Pacific Ocean.

- Hurricane Norbert (1984) – Category 4 hurricane that took an erratic and unusual track several hundred miles south of Baja California, making landfall there as a tropical storm
- Hurricane Norbert (1990) – Category 1 hurricane that stayed at sea
- Hurricane Norbert (2008) – Category 4 hurricane that struck Baja California at Category 2 strength
- Hurricane Norbert (2014) – a Category 3 hurricane that affected Western Mexico and the Baja California Peninsula
- Tropical Storm Norbert (2020) – moderate tropical storm that stayed at sea
- Tropical Storm Norbert (2026) – moderate tropical storm that stayed at sea
