= Hurricane Norbert (2008) =

Category 4 Pacific hurricane in 2008

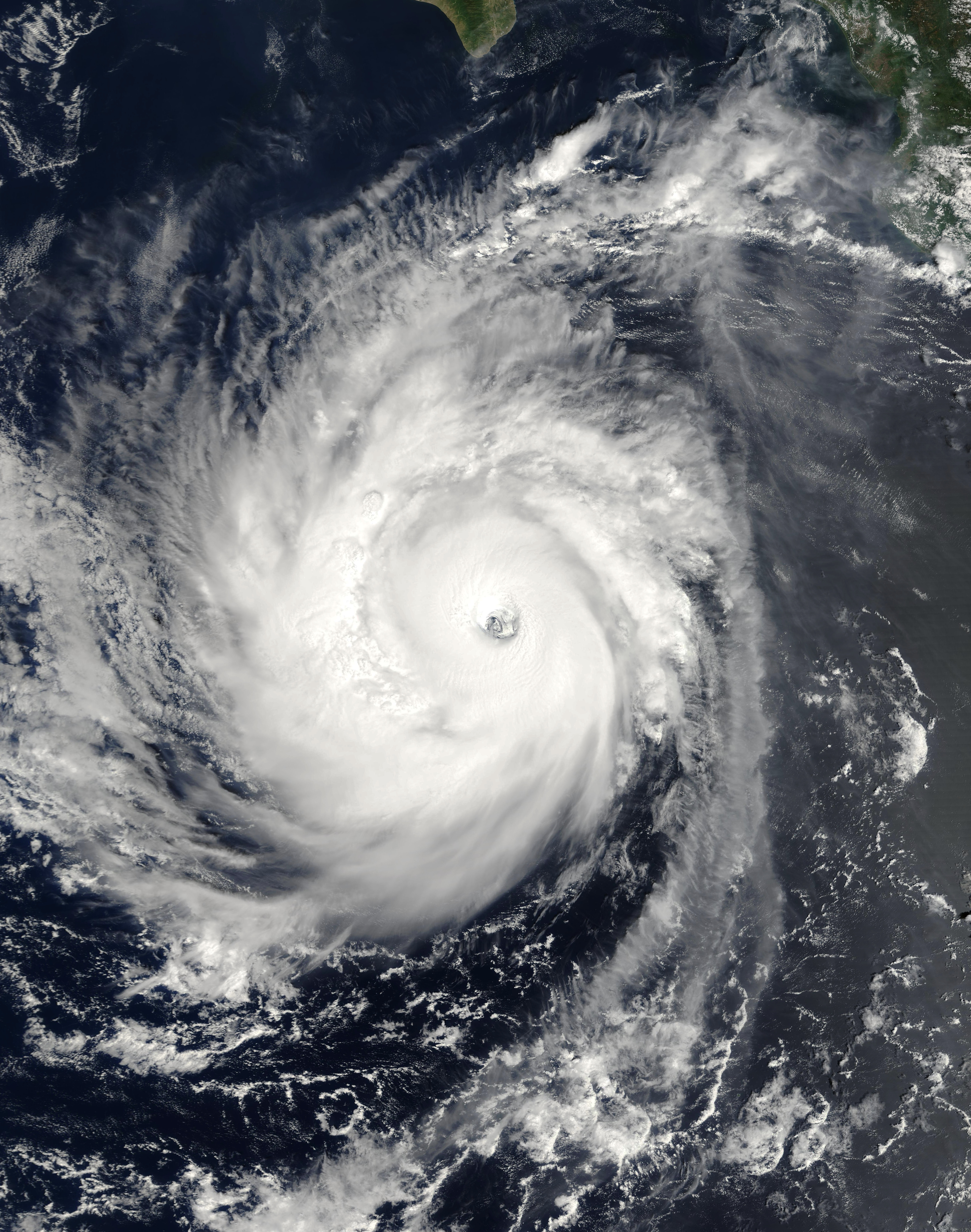
- Hurricane Norbert at peak intensity on October 8

Meteorological history
- Formed: October 3, 2008
- Dissipated: October 12, 2008

Category 4 major hurricane
- 1-minute sustained (SSHWS/NWS)
- Highest winds: 130 mph (215 km/h)
- Lowest pressure: 945 mbar (hPa); 27.91 inHg

Overall effects
- Fatalities: 25 confirmed
- Missing: 3
- Damage: $98.5 million (2008 USD)
- Areas affected: Baja California Sur, Sonora, and Sinaloa
- IBTrACS
- Part of the 2008 Pacific hurricane season

Hurricane Norbert is tied with Hurricane Jimena as the strongest tropical cyclone to strike the west coast of Baja California Sur in recorded history. The fifteenth named storm, seventh hurricane, and second major hurricane of the 2008 hurricane season, Norbert originated as a tropical depression from a tropical wave south of Acapulco on October 3. Strong wind shear initially prevented much development, but the cyclone encountered a more favorable environment as it moved westward. On October 5, the National Hurricane Center (NHC) upgraded the depression to Tropical Storm Norbert, and the system intensified further to attain hurricane intensity by October 6. After undergoing a period of rapid deepening, Norbert reached its peak intensity as a Category 4 on the Saffir–Simpson hurricane wind scale, with maximum sustained winds of 135 mph (217 km/h) and a minimum barometric pressure of 945 mbar (945 hPa; 27.9 inHg). As the cyclone rounded the western periphery of a subtropical ridge over Mexico, it began an eyewall replacement cycle which led to steady weakening. Completing this cycle and briefly reintensifying into a major hurricane, a Category 3 or higher on the Saffir–Simpson hurricane wind scale, Norbert moved ashore Baja California Sur as a Category 2 hurricane late on October 11. After a second landfall at a weaker intensity the following day, the system quickly weakened over land and dissipated that afternoon.

In preparation for the cyclone, the NHC issued hurricane warnings for coastal regions of the Baja California Peninsula. Residents living in low-lying areas and flood-prone regions were advised to evacuate, and beach-goers were warned to stay out of the water. Upon landfall, the hurricane produced waves in excess of 13 ft (4.0 m). Though the strongest winds observed were less than hurricane intensity, heavy rainfall as a result of Norbert lead to substantial damage. In Baja California Sur, roughly 5,000 homes sustained major damage; the heaviest-impacted municipality, Comondú, reported 16,000 homes affected. Thousands of people were forced into shelters, and many trees were blown down by strong winds. A total of 25 fatalities occurred in Sonora, five of which occurred in Álamos, where excessive rainfall caused a majority of the town to become flooded; homes were submerged to their roofs and many trees were downed. The hurricane severely impacted the fishing industry in Sinaloa, while thousands of residents were left homeless. In the United States, Norbert produced minimal rainfall. In the aftermath of the storm, many towns and municipalities were declared disaster areas. Overall, Norbert inflicted $98.5 million (2008 USD) in damage.

== Meteorological history ==
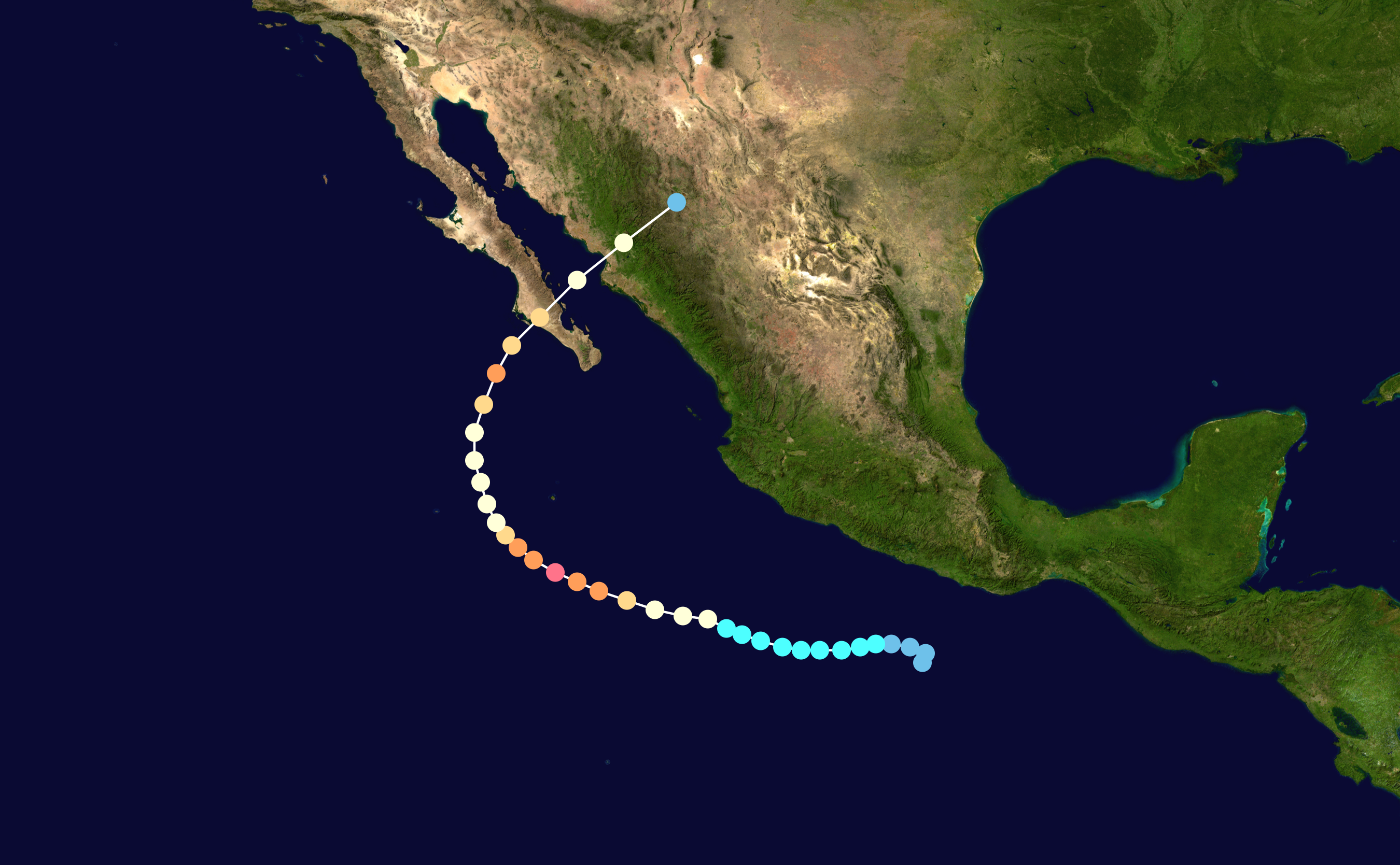
Map plotting the storm's track and intensity, according to the Saffir–Simpson scale Map key Saffir–Simpson scale Tropical depression (≤38 mph, ≤62 km/h) Tropical storm (39–73 mph, 63–118 km/h) Category 1 (74–95 mph, 119–153 km/h) Category 2 (96–110 mph, 154–177 km/h) Category 3 (111–129 mph, 178–208 km/h) Category 4 (130–156 mph, 209–251 km/h) Category 5 (≥157 mph, ≥252 km/h) Unknown Storm type Tropical cyclone Subtropical cyclone Extratropical cyclone, remnant low, tropical disturbance, or monsoon depression

The origins of Norbert were from a tropical wave that crossed Central America on September 26 and September 27. An area of disturbed weather formed near the Gulf of Tehuantepec on September 28, which at that time was mentioned on the Tropical Weather Outlook (an outlook issued every six hours during hurricane season by the NHC that notes the possibility of tropical cyclogenesis during the next 48 hours). Drifting westward off the coast of Mexico, the system initially consisted of a broad low pressure area and an area of disorganized convection. It slowly organized for several days, and by early on October 4 the system developed enough organized convection to be classified as Tropical Depression Fifteen; at that point, it was located about 230 miles (370 km) south of Acapulco. The depression was located over an area of warm water temperatures and moderate vertical wind shear, and as such was forecast to intensify gradually.

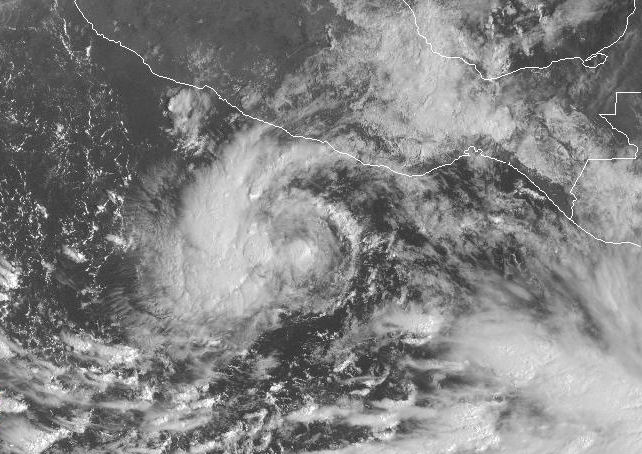
Tropical Depression Fifteen-E on October 4

About six hours after forming, the circulation of the depression became exposed from the deep convection, due to the wind shear. At the same time, two tropical cyclone forecast models predicted the tropical cyclone formation of a larger disturbance to the southeast of the depression. One model predicted the new cyclone to absorb the depression, although most other models forecast for the depression to remain the dominant system. By early on October 5, deep convection developed and organized around the center of the depression, and satellite intensity estimates using the Dvorak technique suggested that the system had tropical storm force-winds; as a result, the NHC upgraded the depression to Tropical Storm Norbert, about 245 mi (395 km) south of Zihuatanejo. Norbert slowly intensified, and was upgraded to a hurricane on October 6 as very deep atmospheric convection remained stable despite easterly wind shear.

On October 7, Hurricane Norbert reached Category 2 intensity on the Saffir-Simpson Hurricane Scale while Norbert developed well-defined and closed eyewall as seen in microwave imagery. Overnight on October 8, an eye appeared on infrared satellite, indicating that Norbert was intensifying and the storm was upgraded to a major hurricane respectively. Continuing to rapidly strengthen over warm sea surface temperatures, it reached Category 4 status late on October 8, after intensifying 45 mph (72 km/h) over the previous 24 hours. The storm peak intensity was 135 mph (217 km/h) and a peak pressure of 945 mbar (hPa; 27.91 inHg) while located 350 mi (560 km) south of Cabo San Lucas, Baja California Sur. The peak intensity of Norbert is uncertain as aircraft-based wind speed observations were lower than estimates via Dvorak Technique. However, the cloud pattern became less impressive early on October 9, and was thus downgraded into a Category 3 hurricane, with winds of 125 mph (201 km/h) as it moved. The eye began to erode and as such Norbert underwent an eyewall replacement cycle, where one eye is replaced by another. As a result, when Hurricane Hunters investigated the storm later that day, they found that Norbert had weakened considerably. At that time, it was downgraded into a weak Category 1 hurricane on October 9.

On October 10, Norbert turned towards the north while slowing down as it reached the western edge of a subtropical ridge. In an area of light wind shear, Norbert began to re-intensify as the eyewall replacement cycle completed. The cyclone turned to the north-northeast due to a mid to upper-level trough that was moving over the Southwest United States. Norbert managed to restrengthen into a Category 3 hurricane on 0600 UTC October 11, and made landfall as a Category 2 hurricane near Puerto Chale. The next day, Norbert struck southern Sonora at Category 1 intensity. Norbert rapidly dissipated by October 12 while inland over Mexico. Norbert was a Category 2 hurricane at landfall and is currently tied with Hurricane Jimena for the strongest storm to strike the west coast of the Baja California Peninsula.

== Preparations ==
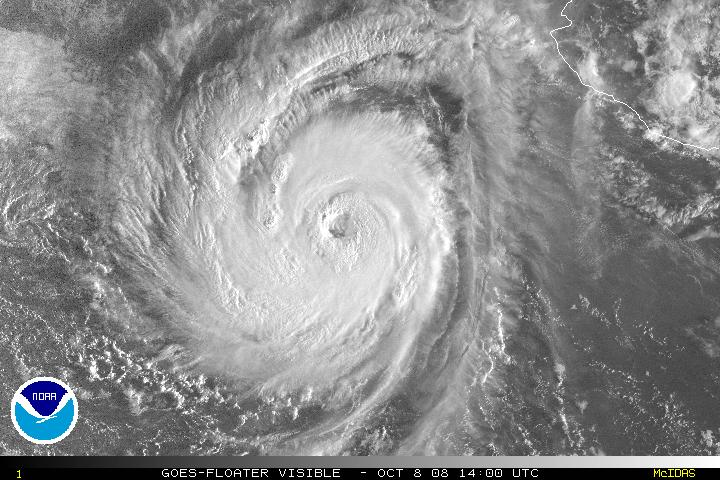
Norbert as a Category 3 hurricane

A hurricane warning was issued on October 10 for parts of the central Baja California Peninsula from Puerto San Andresito southward to Agua Blanca, and they extended around the peninsula from La Paz to Loreto. The warnings were put in place on the mainland west coast from Topolobampo to Guaymas. Hurricane watches were issued from Agua Blanca to Cabo San Lucas, and were extended around the Baja California peninsula to La Paz; these same areas were also under tropical storm warnings as well. Tropical storm warnings also extended from Loreto northward to Mulegé on the eastern side of the peninsula.

On October 10, officials in Baja California declared the municipalities of Loreto, Comondú and La Paz disaster areas in anticipation of severe damage from the hurricane. The mayor of Los Cabos, Óscar Núñez, strongly advised residents living in sub-par housing and in low-lying areas to prepare to evacuate. The local civil protection official stated bridges are ready to begin evacuating. As the storm produced cloudy skies in Baja California, fishermen moved their boats onto the beach in La Paz. Beach officials warned people to stay out of the water. As flood water rose, residents fled from their homes and into shelters. "All precautions are in place ... we have prepared temporary shelters," said Jose Gajón, director of Baja California Sur rescue services. The NHC warned interests in the area to monitor the progress of Norbert. The storm was expected by the NHC to reach the U.S. States of New Mexico, Texas, and Arizona as a tropical depression. In Ciudad Obregón, Sonora, farmers rushed to fertilize the fields prior to the passage of Norbert.

== Impact ==
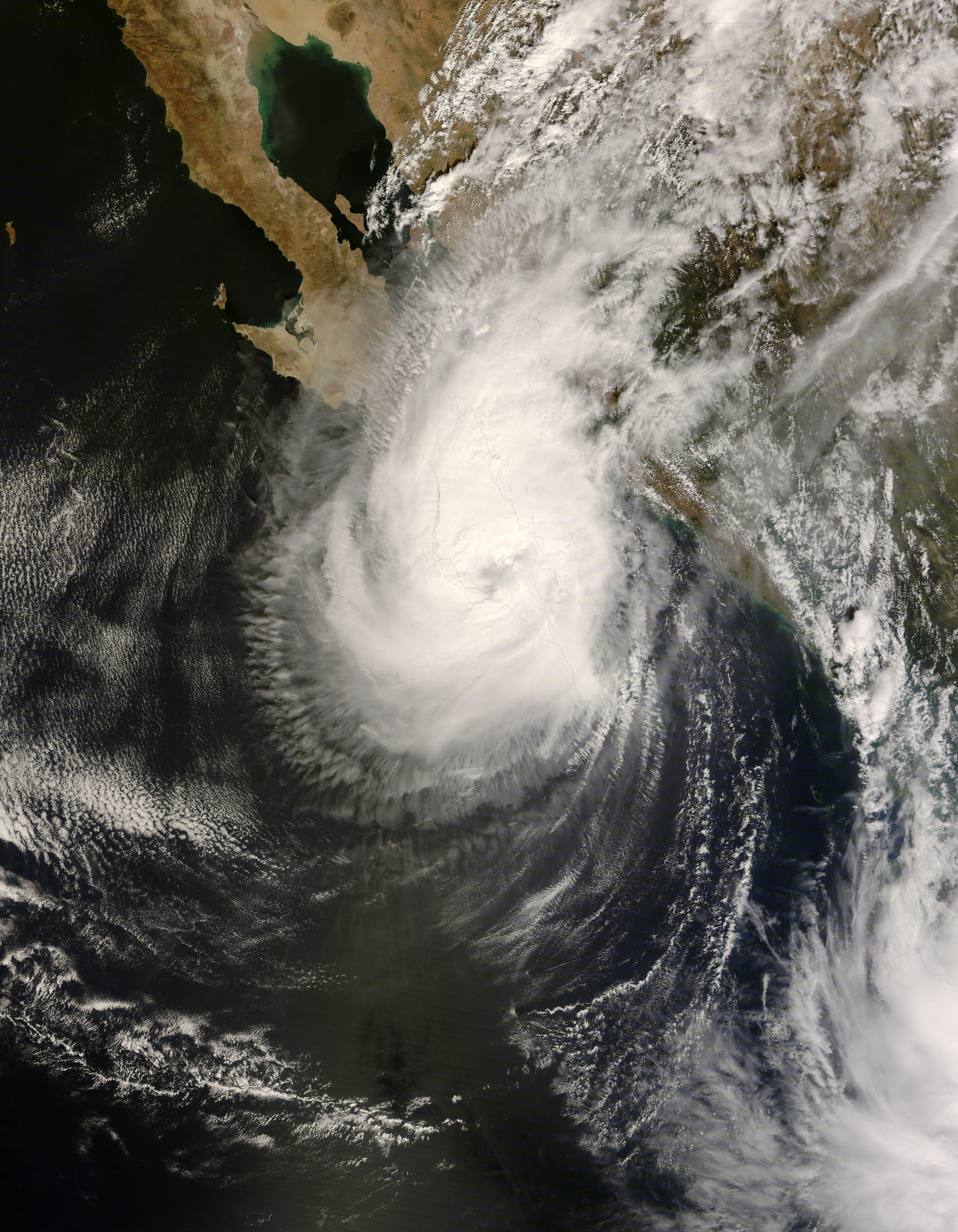
Hurricane Norbert at its landfall on Baja California Sur on October 11

=== Baja California Sur ===
The storm was responsible for 13 ft (4.0 m) waves. Norbert was also responsible produced peak winds of 60 mph (97 km/h) and a 70 mph (110 km/h) gust in Los Mochis. This observation occurred at 0200 UTC October 12. The maximum single-day rainfall total from Norbert was 4.78 in (121 mm) in Ciudad Constitucion.

Throughout Baja California Sur, officials estimated that damages from the hurricane was equivalent to 292.2 million MXN (25 million USD). Water damages totaled to 8.8 million MXN (US$650,000). Furthermore, damage to homes was 68.3 million pesos (US$6 million) while damage to school was reported to be 5 million MXN (US$41,000). In addition, highway damage totaled to 36.6 million MXN (USD). Roughly 5,000 homes sustained severe damage and roads throughout the state were also severely affected. About 100,000 people were without power at the height of the storm. The worst damage occurred in the municipality of Comondú where 16,000 residents reported damage to their homes. A total of 2,850 people were housed in temporary shelters. According to tourism officials, hotel reservations were down 40% in Los Cabos and Lorento Roofs were ripped off buildings and many trees were damaged. On the islands of Santa Margarita and Magdalena, 40% of homes received some damage, mostly roof damage. La Paz International Airport closed prior to the arrival of the system, but Los Cabos International Airport remained open throughout the passage of the tropical cyclone. In La Paz, the storm produced violent winds, a few last-minute drivers on streets with fallen trees. Rescue workers had to rescue many residents of low-lying areas from their wood and sheet metal homes. In a drive-thru entrance, a happy hour sign was ripped off due to strong winds. Local residents south shelter by school buses and army trucks as floodwaters entered their homes. High winds uprooted palm trees and the water was knee-deep in many areas of Puerto San Carlos.

The storm also affected cruise ships. While Carnival Pride and Island Princess survived the worst of the hurricane, the Carnival Elation was expected to arrive one day earlier than initially anticipated.

=== Sonora ===
After crossing the Gulf of California, Norbert made landfall in Sonora as a strong Category 1 hurricane. A total of 25 people were killed, five of which were in Álamos. In addition, three others were reported as missing. Total damage in Sonora, excluding the city of Álamos, was estimated at MXN 800 million (2008, $59.1 million). At the port of Topolobampo, rough seas from the storm sank four ships and damaged 70 others. The city of Álamos sustained the most severe damage in the area, with damage exceeding MXN 200 million ($14.7 million). In Álamos, water rushed down the mountains nearby, flooding almost every channel in the city. Some scared residents fled to rooftops and higher ground. A total of 95 homes were destroyed and concrete walls were knocked down. Cars and trucks smashed in trees. Furniture and other personal items were on the streets after the storm.

=== Sinaloa ===
The fishing industry in Sinaloa sustained severe losses, with 200 shrimp boats being destroyed leaving MXN 8 million (2008, US$600,000 ) in damages. Roughly 6,000 people were left homeless in Sinaloa as hundreds of homes were damaged or destroyed by Norbert. Officials evacuated 6,000 people in four municipalities (Guasave, Ahome, Choix and El Fuerte). Due to flooding, officials announced that would evacuate seven communities. The port of Mazatlán was closed for navigation. A state of emergency was declared for five municipalities throughout the region.

=== United States ===
The remnants of the storm dropped moderate precipitation across western Texas, but there were no immediate issues. Across New Mexico, a deep upper-level low enhanced moisture across the region. A severe thunderstorm moved over Torrance County. Six power poles were snapped, a steel building was destroyed and blown onto Interstate 40 and three water tanks were severely damaged. Winds of 60 to 70 mph (97 to 113 km/h) were recorded with gusts up to 100 mph (160 km/h). Throughout the state, total damage equaled $143,000.

== Aftermath ==
On October 14, Governor Eduardo Bours Castelo of Sonora announced a two-year reconstruction plan for Álamos with an initial budget of MXN 100 million ($7.3 million). The government of Sonora provided at least MXN 400 million ($29.5 million) in relief funds following the hurricane. In Sinaloa, the municipalities of Ahome, El Fuerte, Choix, Guasave and the city of Sinaloa de Leyva were declared disaster areas following the storm, allowing federal funding and supplies to be sent to the regions. Most of northern Sinaloa was also declared a disaster area.

== See also ==
- Other tropical cyclones named Norbert
- Hurricane Jimena (2009)
- Hurricane Fausto (1996)
