= List of off-season South-West Indian Ocean tropical cyclones =

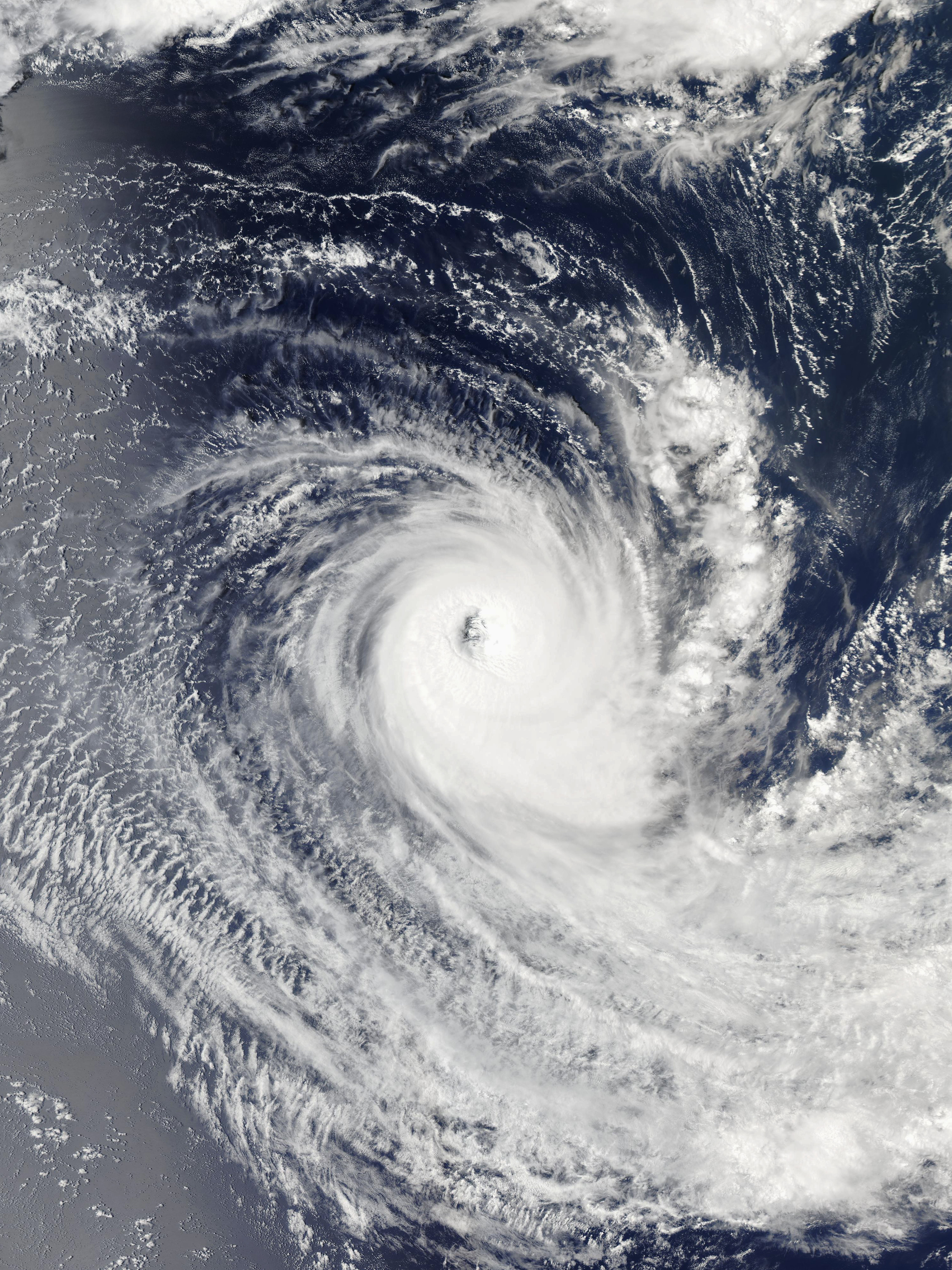
Cyclone Bheki near peak strength on 18 November 2024

An off-season South-West Indian Ocean tropical cyclone is a tropical cyclone that exists in the South-West Indian Ocean basin outside of the official tropical cyclone season. The World Meteorological Organization currently defines the season as occurring between November 15 and April 30, of the following year, with the exception for Mauritius and the Seychelles, for which it lasts through May 15 rather than April 30. As of 2026, there have been at least 122 tropical cyclones known to have occurred off-season. Cumulatively, at least 165 deaths occurred due to the storms, and the most recent off-season storm was Tropical Storm Agueda in October 2026.

== Systems ==
The wind speeds listed are maximum ten-minute average sustained winds, while the pressure is the minimum barometric pressure, both of which are estimates taken from the archives of either Météo-France, the Australian Bureau of Meteorology, the Fiji Meteorological Service, and New Zealand's MetService. If there are no known estimates of either the winds or pressure then the system is listed as "Not specified" under winds or pressure, if there is no known estimated winds or pressure. For deaths and damages "None" indicates that there were no reports of fatalities, although such storms may have impacted land. The damage totals are the United States dollar of the year of the storm.

=== Pre–1960s ===
Name	Dates	Peak intensity			Areas affected	Damage (USD)	Deaths	Ref(s).
Name	Dates	Category	Wind speed	Pressure	Areas affected	Damage (USD)	Deaths	Ref(s).
Unnamed	1-7 November, 1851	Not specified	Not specified	Not specified	None	None	None	
Unnamed	31 October – 5 November, 1854	Not specified	Not specified	Not specified	None	None	None	
Unnamed	11-17 May, 1855	Not specified	Not specified	Not specified	None	None	None	
Unnamed	31 October – 3 November, 1858	Not specified	Not specified	Not specified	None	None	None	
Unnamed	31 May – 3 June, 1859	Not specified	Not specified	Not specified	None	None	None	
Unnamed	11-15 June, 1859	Not specified	Not specified	Not specified	None	None	None	
Unnamed	1-7 May, 1860	Not specified	Not specified	Not specified	None	None	None	
Unnamed	11-15 November, 1861	Not specified	Not specified	Not specified	None	None	None	
Unnamed	11-14 October, 1862	Not specified	Not specified	Not specified	None	None	None	
Unnamed	11-16 November, 1862	Not specified	Not specified	Not specified	None	None	None	
Unnamed	21-30 May, 1863	Not specified	Not specified	Not specified	None	None	None	
Unnamed	31 October – 3 November, 1863	Not specified	Not specified	Not specified	None	None	None	
Unnamed	1-5 November, 1866	Not specified	Not specified	Not specified	None	None	None	
Unnamed	1-7 May, 1867	Not specified	Not specified	Not specified	None	None	None	
Unnamed	11-17 November, 1868	Not specified	Not specified	Not specified	None	None	None	
Unnamed	1-8 November, 1869	Not specified	Not specified	Not specified	None	None	None	
Unnamed	1-5 May, 1872	Not specified	Not specified	Not specified	None	None	None	
Unnamed	1-6 October, 1872	Not specified	Not specified	Not specified	None	None	None	
Unnamed	31 October – 4 November, 1872	Not specified	Not specified	Not specified	None	None	None	
Unnamed	11-17 May, 1877	Not specified	Not specified	Not specified	None	None	None	
Unnamed	9-14 November, 1884	Tropical storm	Not specified	Not specified	None	None	None	
Unnamed	11-18 May, 1885	Not specified	Not specified	Not specified	None	None	None	
Unnamed	9-12 November, 1899	Tropical storm	Not specified	Not specified	None	None	None	
Unnamed	9-13 November, 1902	Tropical storm	Not specified	Not specified	None	None	None	
Unnamed	9-10 May, 1907	Tropical storm	Not specified	Not specified	None	None	None	
Unnamed	9-15 May, 1912	Tropical depression	45 km/h (30 mph)	Not Specified	None	None	None	
Unnamed	23-29 May, 1916	Moderate tropical storm	65 km/h (40 mph)	Not Specified	Mauritius	None	None	
Unnamed	9-12 November, 1921	Tropical depression	45 km/h (30 mph)	Not Specified	None	None	None	
Unnamed	9-14 November, 1927	Tropical depression	45 km/h (30 mph)	Not Specified	None	None	None	
Unnamed	7-12 May, 1929	Moderate tropical storm	65 km/h (40 mph)	Not Specified	Mauritius	None	None	
Unnamed	9-13 September, 1929	Tropical depression	45 km/h (30 mph)	Not Specified	None	None	None	
Unnamed	31 October – 5 November, 1934	Tropical depression	45 km/h (30 mph)	Not Specified	None	None	None	
Unnamed	9-14 November, 1934	Tropical depression	45 km/h (30 mph)	Not Specified	None	None	None	
Unnamed	14-19 November, 1934	Tropical depression	45 km/h (30 mph)	Not Specified	Madagascar	None	None	
Unnamed	9-17 May, 1940	Tropical depression	45 km/h (30 mph)	Not Specified	None	None	None	
Unnamed	15-26 September, 1944	Tropical depression	45 km/h (30 mph)	Not Specified	Mauritius	None	None	
Unnamed	22-31 October, 1944	Moderate tropical storm	65 km/h (40 mph)	Not Specified	None	None	None	
Unnamed	2-6 June, 1949	Moderate tropical storm	65 km/h (40 mph)	Not Specified	Mauritius	None	None	
Unnamed	15-21 October, 1950	Moderate tropical storm	65 km/h (40 mph)	Not Specified	None	None	None	
Unnamed	10-28 May, 1952	Moderate tropical storm	65 km/h (40 mph)	Not Specified	Madagascar	None	None	
Unnamed	20-29 July, 1954	Moderate tropical storm	65 km/h (40 mph)	Not Specified	None	None	None	
Unnamed	11-23 October, 1954	Moderate tropical storm	65 km/h (40 mph)	Not Specified	None	None	None	
Unnamed	4-8 November, 1954	Tropical depression	45 km/h (30 mph)	Not Specified	None	None	None	
Unnamed	29 October – 4 November, 1959	Tropical depression	55 km/h (35 mph)	Not Specified	Madagascar	None	None	

=== 1960s ===
Name	Dates	Peak intensity			Areas affected	Damage (USD)	Deaths	Ref(s).
Name	Dates	Category	Wind speed	Pressure	Areas affected	Damage (USD)	Deaths	Ref(s).
Anna	11-14 November, 1960	Tropical storm	65 km/h (40 mph)	Not Specified	None	None	None	
Amy	6-16 October, 1962	Moderate tropical storm	75 km/h (45 mph)	Not Specified	None	None	None	
Jose	29 April – 3 May, 1964	Moderate tropical storm	75 km/h (45 mph)	Not Specified	None	None	None	
Karen	2-10 May, 1964	Moderate tropical storm	85 km/h (50 mph)	Not Specified	None	None	None	
Rose	27 April – 6 May, 1965	Moderate tropical storm	75 km/h (45 mph)	Not Specified	Réunion	None	None	
Anne	15-15 August, 1965	Tropical disturbance	35 km/h (25 mph)	Not Specified	None	None	None	
Brenda	16-18 August, 1965	Tropical disturbance	45 km/h (30 mph)	Not Specified	None	None	None	
Lily	22 April – 1 May, 1966	Tropical depression	55 km/h (35 mph)	Not Specified	None	None	None	
Angela	28 September – 6 October, 1966	Moderate tropical storm	65 km/h (40 mph)	Not Specified	None	None	None	
Kathy	12-21 May, 1967	Tropical disturbance	45 km/h (30 mph)	Not Specified	None	None	None	
Anita	30 October – 2 November, 1967	Moderate tropical storm	65 km/h (40 mph)	Not Specified	None	None	None	
Annie	28 October – 4 November, 1968	Severe tropical storm	100 km/h (65 mph)	Not Specified	None	None	None	
Aline	19-22 August, 1969	Severe tropical storm	100 km/h (65 mph)	Not Specified	None	None	None	
Blanche	7-15 October, 1969	Tropical cyclone	130 km/h (80 mph)	Not Specified	None	None	None	
Corrine	11-21 November, 1969	Moderate tropical storm	85 km/h (50 mph)	Not Specified	Comoros, Mozambique	Unknown	26	

=== 1970s ===
Name	Dates	Peak intensity			Areas affected	Damage (USD)	Deaths	Ref(s).
Name	Dates	Category	Wind speed	Pressure	Areas affected	Damage (USD)	Deaths	Ref(s).
Andree	16-19 September, 1970	Tropical disturbance	45 km/h (30 mph)	Not Specified	None	None	None	
Betsy	1–9 October 1970	Moderate tropical storm	65 km/h (40 mph)	Not Specified	None	None	None	
Andrea–Claudine	31 October – 13 November 1970	Moderate tropical storm	65 km/h (40 mph)	970 hPa (28.64 inHg)	None	None	None	
Odette	9–16 July 1971	Moderate tropical storm	65 km/h (40 mph)	Not Specified	None	None	None	
Marcelle	1–3 May 1973	Tropical cyclone	130 km/h (80 mph)	972 hPa (28.70 inHg)	Australia	Unknown	None	
Alice	14–24 September 1973	Moderate tropical storm	75 km/h (45 mph)	1,000 hPa (29.53 inHg)	None	None	None	
Bernadette	16–28 October 1973	Tropical cyclone	150 km/h (90 mph)	985 hPa (29.09 inHg)	Madagascar	Unknown	None	
Agathe	3–14 October 1976	Moderate tropical storm	65 km/h (40 mph)	995 hPa (29.38 inHg)	None	None	None	

=== 1980s ===
Name	Dates	Peak intensity			Areas affected	Damage (USD)	Deaths	Ref(s).
Name	Dates	Category	Wind speed	Pressure	Areas affected	Damage (USD)	Deaths	Ref(s).
Bessi–Armelle	1–20 November 1981	Severe tropical storm	100 km/h (65 mph)	976 hPa (28.82 inHg)	None	None	None	
Unnamed	4–6 July 1982	Tropical depression	55 km/h (35 mph)	Not Specified	None	None	None	
Arilisy	27–30 October 1982	Tropical depression	45 km/h (30 mph)	997 hPa (29.44 inHg)	None	None	None	
Fely	22–24 June 1983	Tropical depression	35 km/h (25 mph)	1,003 hPa (29.62 inHg)	None	None	None	
Unnamed	9–17 November 1984	Moderate tropical storm	85 km/h (50 mph)	987 hPa (29.15 inHg)	None	None	None	
Unnamed	22–29 September 1985	Moderate tropical storm	75 km/h (45 mph)	Not Specified	None	None	None	
Billy–Lila	9–10 May 1986	Tropical cyclone	140 km/h (85 mph)	950 hPa (28.05 inHg)	None	None	None	
Unnamed	31 October – 9 November 1987	Severe tropical storm	100 km/h (65 mph)	Not Specified	None	None	None	
Iarisena	6–14 May 1988	Moderate tropical storm	65 km/h (40 mph)	991 hPa (29.26 inHg)	None	None	None	
Adelinina	1–8 November 1988	Moderate tropical storm	85 km/h (50 mph)	984 hPa (29.06 inHg)	None	None	None	
Barisaona	12–23 November 1988	Tropical cyclone	140 km/h (85 mph)	954 hPa (28.17 inHg)	None	None	None	
Unnamed	21–27 September 1989	Tropical depression	55 km/h (35 mph)	Not Specified	None	None	None	

=== 1990s ===
Name	Dates	Peak intensity			Areas affected	Damage (USD)	Deaths	Ref(s).
Name	Dates	Category	Wind speed	Pressure	Areas affected	Damage (USD)	Deaths	Ref(s).
Ikonjo	11–21 May 1990	Severe tropical storm	95 km/h (60 mph)	976 hPa (28.82 inHg)	Seychelles	1.5 million	None	
01S	19–25 September 1990	Tropical depression	55 km/h (35 mph)	Not Specified	None	None	None	
Gritelle	5–16 June 1991	Moderate tropical storm	85 km/h (50 mph)	984 hPa (29.06 inHg)	None	None	None	
Aviona	27 September – 5 October 1992	Moderate tropical storm	75 km/h (45 mph)	988 hPa (29.18 inHg)	None	None	None	
Babie	18–21 October 1992	Moderate tropical storm	75 km/h (45 mph)	991 hPa (29.26 inHg)	None	None	None	
Konita	2–7 May 1993	Tropical cyclone	130 km/h (80 mph)	955 hPa (28.20 inHg)	None	None	None	
Antoinette	17–21 October 1996	Severe tropical cyclone	110 km/h (70 mph)	965 hPa (28.50 inHg)	None	None	None	
Melanie–Bellamine	1–11 November 1996	Intense tropical cyclone	175 km/h (110 mph)	925 hPa (27.32 inHg)	None	None	None	

=== 2000s ===
Name	Dates	Peak intensity			Areas affected	Damage (USD)	Deaths	Ref(s).
Name	Dates	Category	Wind speed	Pressure	Areas affected	Damage (USD)	Deaths	Ref(s).
12S	20–24 June 2001	Subtropical depression	95 km/h (60 mph)	995 hPa (29.38 inHg)	None	None	None	
Alex–Andre	28 October – 8 November 2001	Severe tropical storm	95 km/h (60 mph)	985 hPa (29.09 inHg)	None	None	None	
Kesiny	2–11 May 2002	Tropical cyclone	130 km/h (80 mph)	965 hPa (28.50 inHg)	Madagascar	Unknown	33	
01S	5–8 September 2002	Moderate tropical storm	65 km/h (40 mph)	1,003 hPa (29.62 inHg)	Seychelles	50,000	None	
Atang	4–13 November 2002	Tropical depression	55 km/h (35 mph)	997 hPa (29.44 inHg)	Madagascar, Mozambique, Tanzania	Unknown	Several	
Boura	14–27 November 2002	Tropical cyclone	130 km/h (80 mph)	965 hPa (28.50 inHg)	Mauritius, Réunion	Unknown	None	
Manou	2–10 May 2003	Tropical cyclone	155 km/h (100 mph)	950 hPa (28.05 inHg)	Mauritius, Madagascar	Unknown	89	
Abaimba	28 September – 4 October 2003	Moderate tropical storm	85 km/h (50 mph)	995 hPa (29.38 inHg)	None	None	None	
Beni	9–25 November 2003	Intense tropical cyclone	175 km/h (110 mph)	935 hPa (27.61 inHg)	Réunion	Unknown	None	
Juba	5–17 May 2004	Severe tropical storm	100 km/h (65 mph)	980 hPa (28.94 inHg)	None	None	None	
Arola	6–18 November 2004	Severe tropical storm	110 km/h (70 mph)	978 hPa (28.88 inHg)	None	None	None	
Asma	15–24 October 2008	Moderate tropical storm	85 km/h (50 mph)	988 hPa (29.18 inHg)	Madagascar	Unknown	1	
Anja	13–18 November 2009	Intense tropical cyclone	165 km/h (105 mph)	950 hPa (28.05 inHg)	None	None	None	

=== 2010s ===
Name	Dates	Peak intensity			Areas affected	Damage (USD)	Deaths	Ref(s).
Name	Dates	Category	Wind speed	Pressure	Areas affected	Damage (USD)	Deaths	Ref(s).
Joël	26–29 May 2010	Subtropical depression	110 km/h (70 mph)	990 hPa (29.23 inHg)	Mozambique, Madagascar	Unknown	None	
Kuena	3–8 June 2012	Moderate tropical storm	85 km/h (50 mph)	994 hPa (29.35 inHg)	None	None	None	
Anais	12–19 October 2012	Intense tropical cyclone	185 km/h (115 mph)	945 hPa (27.91 inHg)	None	None	None	
Abela	15–19 July 2016	Severe tropical storm	95 km/h (60 mph)	987 hPa (29.15 inHg)	Madagascar	None	None	
Bransby	3–6 October 2016	Subtropical depression	100 km/h (65 mph)	987 hPa (29.15 inHg)	None	None	None	
01	14–17 September 2018	Moderate tropical storm	75 km/h (45 mph)	995 hPa (29.38 inHg)	None	None	None	
Alcide	5–11 November 2018	Intense tropical cyclone	185 km/h (115 mph)	960 hPa (28.35 inHg)	None	None	None	

=== 2020s ===
Name	Dates	Peak intensity			Areas affected	Damage (USD)	Deaths	Ref(s).
Name	Dates	Category	Wind speed	Pressure	Areas affected	Damage (USD)	Deaths	Ref(s).
Alicia	12–17 November 2020	Tropical cyclone	120 km/h (75 mph)	975 hPa (28.79 inHg)	None	None	None	
Karim	5–7 May 2022	Moderate tropical storm	75 km/h (45 mph)	993 hPa (29.32 inHg)	None	None	None	
Ashley	23–28 September 2022	Moderate tropical storm	85 km/h (50 mph)	995 hPa (29.38 inHg)	None	None	None	
Balita	3–9 October 2022	Moderate tropical storm	65 km/h (40 mph)	996 hPa (29.41 inHg)	None	None	None	
Fabien	12–21 May 2023	Intense tropical cyclone	165 km/h (105 mph)	959 hPa (28.32 inHg)	Diego Garcia	None	16	
Hidaya	30 April – 4 May 2024	Tropical cyclone	150 km/h (90 mph)	967 hPa (28.56 inHg)	Seychelles, Comoros, Tanzania	None	1	
Ialy	16–22 May 2024	Tropical cyclone	120 km/h (75 mph)	981 hPa (28.97 inHg)	Seychelles, Madagascar, Tanzania, Kenya, Somalia	None	None	
01	15–17 August 2024	Tropical depression	55 km/h (35 mph)	1,000 hPa (29.53 inHg)	Chagos Archipelago	None	None	
Ancha	30 September – 5 October 2024	Severe tropical storm	95 km/h (60 mph)	992 hPa (29.29 inHg)	None	None	None	
Bheki	12–23 November 2024	Intense tropical cyclone	185 km/h (115 mph)	948 hPa (27.99 inHg)	None	None	None	
01	16 July 2025	Tropical depression	55 km/h (35 mph)	1,001 hPa (29.56 inHg)	None	None	None	
Awo	7–8 August 2025	Moderate tropical storm	75 km/h (45 mph)	1,000 hPa (29.53 inHg)	Agaléga	None	None	
Blossom	9–11 September 2025	Moderate tropical storm	65 km/h (40 mph)	1,001 hPa (29.56 inHg)	None	None	None	
Chenge	17-25 October 2025	Severe tropical Storm	95 km/h (60 mph)	985 hPa (29.09 inHg)	None	None	None	
Agueda	19-23 October 2026	Severe tropical Storm	95 km/h (60 mph)	995 hPa (29.38 inHg)	Seychelles	None	None	

== See also ==
- List of off-season Atlantic hurricanes
- List of off-season Australian region tropical cyclones
- List of off-season South Pacific tropical cyclones
- List of off-season Pacific hurricanes
