= List of off-season Pacific hurricanes =

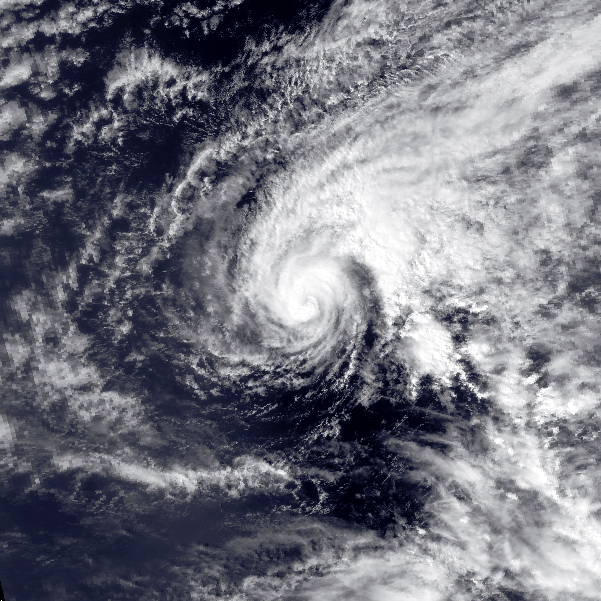
Hurricane Ekeka, the most intense off-season tropical cyclone in the eastern Pacific basin

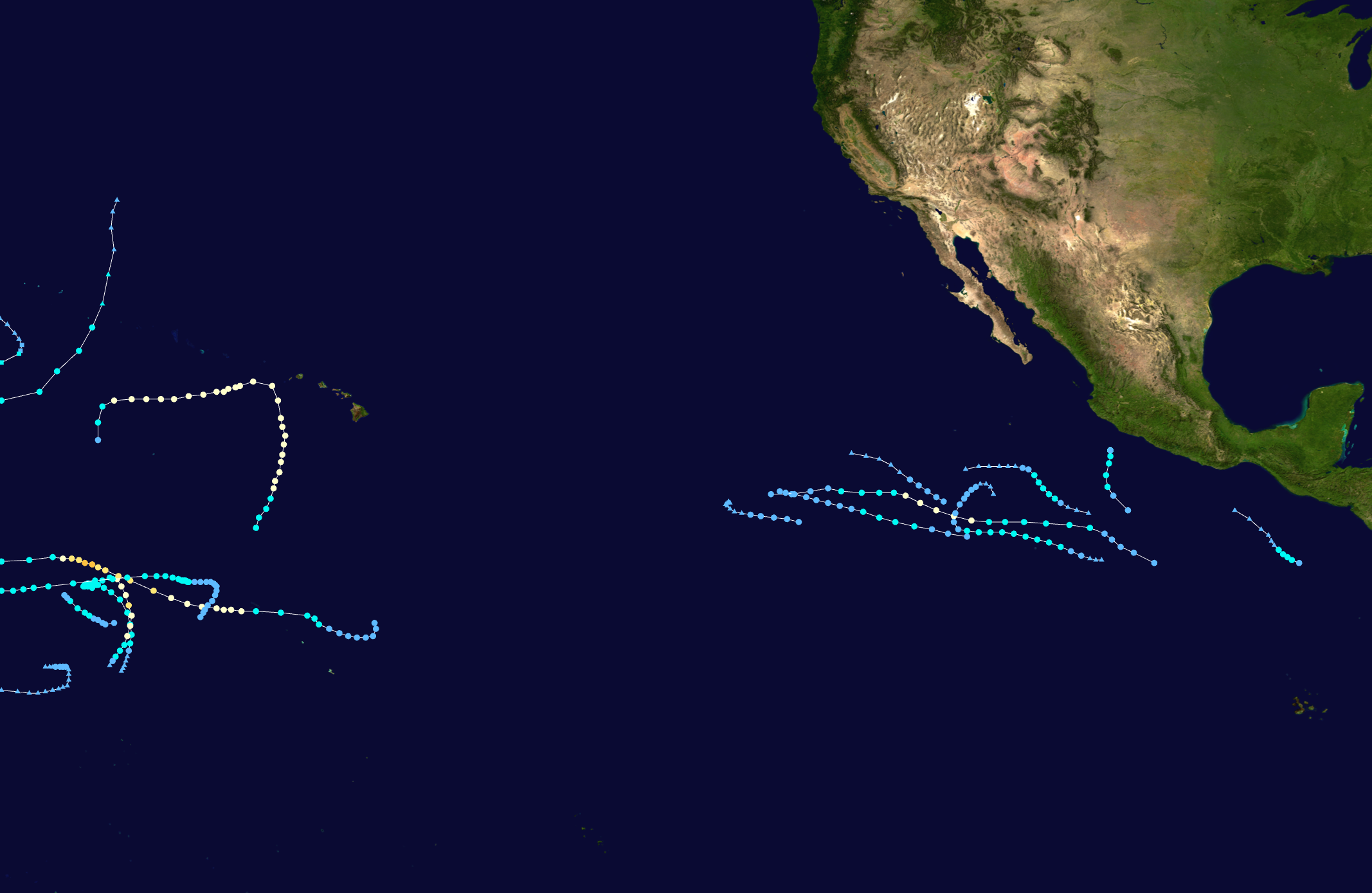
Tracks of all known off-season Pacific hurricanes between 1957 and 2023.

There have been 26 recorded tropical and subtropical cyclones in the North-eastern Pacific basin outside the official Pacific hurricane season. The National Hurricane Center (NHC) monitors the area from North America westward to 140°W, while the Central Pacific Hurricane Center is from 140°W to the International Date Line, north of the equator. (Note: The National Hurricane Center (NHC)'s warning responsibly is often referred to as the "eastern Pacific" while the Central Pacific Hurricane Center (CPHC)'s warning zone is often referred to as the "central Pacific", even though, the two areas are combined in datasets like HURDAT and IBTRACS.) The National Oceanic and Atmospheric Administration (NOAA) currently defines the season as starting May 15 in the eastern Pacific and June 1 for the central Pacific and ending on November 30 for both regions in each calendar year. Occasionally, however, storms develop in late November and persist until December.

Few off-season tropical cyclones in the east Pacific have affected land, and none of them have made landfall. Only Hurricane Nina caused both property damage and fatalities. It prompted evacuations in Hawaii and caused $100,000 (1957 USD) in damage in the state. The storm also killed four people and produced 35 ft (10 m) waves. The strongest hurricane between December and May was Hurricane Ekeka in 1992, which reached winds of 115 mph (185 km/h). In 1997, after Tropical Storm Paka crossed the International Date Line, it intensified into a typhoon with winds equivalent to a Category 5 hurricane on the Saffir–Simpson hurricane wind scale, and caused $580 million (1997 USD) in damage in the Marshall Islands, Guam, and the Northern Mariana Islands. The most recent off-season storm is Tropical Storm Andres in mid-May 2021.

The beginning of HURDAT, the official Pacific hurricane database maintained by the NHC, is 1949. Since then, thirteen storms have occurred outside the official bounds of hurricane season in the eastern and central north Pacific, respectively. The first storm officially to occur outside of the current season was Hurricane Nina in 1957. In addition, the CPHC reports nine off-season storms from 1900 to 1952 with another off-season tropical cyclone occurring in 1832. There have been documents published in the Monthly Weather Review reporting additional off-season storms within 2,000 mi (3,220 km) of the Mexican coastline, including one in December. Of all off-season tropical cyclones, the "Froc Cyclone" lasted longest, spanning 12 days and two calendar years. The year with the most off-season storms was tied between 1904 and 1992, with a total of two tropical cyclones. No Pacific hurricane season had both a pre-season and post-season storm.

== Chronology ==
Saffir–Simpson scale
TD	TS	C1	C2	C3	C4	C5

The wind speeds listed are maximum one-minute average sustained winds. The category refers to the intensity on the Saffir–Simpson hurricane wind scale; TS stands for tropical storm, and TD for tropical depression.

Chronology of off-season Northeastern Pacific tropical cyclones
Storm	Season	Duration	Peak classification	Maximum sustained winds	Notes
Unnamed	1832	December 1832	Unknown	Unknown	
"Froc Cyclone"	1902	December 23, 1902 – January 2, 1903	Unknown	Unknown	
"Zikawei Cyclone"	1904	November 26 – December 4	Unknown	Unknown	
"Hurd Cyclone"	1904	December 23–30	Unknown	Unknown	
"Gauthier Cyclone"	1906	May 3–10	Unknown	Unknown	
Unnamed	1922	February 1922	Unknown	Unknown	
Unnamed	1925	December 22–26	Unknown	Unknown	
Unnamed	1936	December 4	Unknown	Unknown	
Unnamed	1938	January 2–5	Unknown	Unknown	The Monthly Weather Review was uncertain if the storm was a tropical cyclone
Nina	1957	November 29 – December 6	Category 1 hurricane	85 mph (135 km/h)	Caused $100,000 in damage and four fatalities in Hawaii
Carmen	1980	April 4–8	Tropical storm	50 mph (80 km/h)	
Winnie	1983	December 4–7	Category 1 hurricane	90 mph (145 km/h)	Strongest east Pacific tropical cyclone in the month of December; caused minor rainfall in parts of Mexico.
Winona	1989	January 9–15	Tropical storm	45 mph (70 km/h)	
Alma	1990	May 12–20	Category 1 hurricane	85 mph (135 km/h)	
Ekeka	1992	January 28 – February 3	Category 3 hurricane	115 mph (185 km/h)	Strongest off-season east Pacific tropical cyclone
Hali	1992	March 28–30	Tropical storm	50 mph (80 km/h)	
One-E	1996	May 13–16	Tropical storm	50 mph (80 km/h)	Assumed to have caused two deaths after the ship Solar Wind was lost at sea
Paka	1997	December 2–7	Tropical storm	65 mph (105 km/h)	Later became a super typhoon in the West Pacific
Omeka	2010	December 18–22	Tropical storm	60 mph (95 km/h)	Was subtropical from December 18–20 in central Pacific, was in the western Pacific from December 20–22, and tropical on December 22 onward in the central Pacific
Aletta	2012	May 14–19	Tropical storm	50 mph (80 km/h)	
Nine-C	2015	December 31	Tropical depression	35 mph (55 km/h)	Latest formation of a tropical cyclone in the eastern Pacific basin.
Pali	2016	January 7–15	Category 2 hurricane	100 mph (160 km/h)	Earliest formation of a tropical cyclone in the eastern Pacific basin.
Adrian	2017	May 9–10	Tropical storm	45 mph (70 km/h)	
One-E	2018	May 10–11	Tropical depression	35 mph (55 km/h)	
One-E	2020	April 25–26	Tropical depression	35 mph (55 km/h)	Earliest formation of a tropical cyclone in the eastern Pacific basin proper (east of 140°W).
Andres	2021	May 9–11	Tropical storm	40 mph (65 km/h)	Earliest named storm in the East Pacific basin proper.

=== Systems by month ===
Off-season storms are most likely to occur in December, followed by May. Only one cyclone each was reported in February or in March.

Number of recorded off-season cyclones by month
Month	Number of cyclones
January	4
February	1
March	1
April	2
May (1–14)	6
December	11(Includes 2 that formed in November)

== See also ==
- List of off-season Atlantic hurricanes
- List of off-season Australian region tropical cyclones
- List of off-season South Pacific tropical cyclones
- List of off-season South-West Indian Ocean tropical cyclones
