= List of off-season Australian region tropical cyclones =

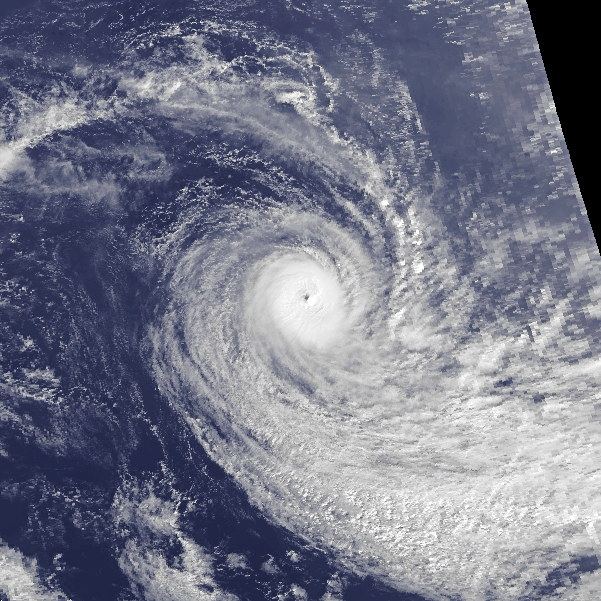
Cyclone Billy–Lila near peak strength off the western coast of Australia on 10 May 1986

An off-season Australian tropical cyclone is a tropical cyclone that existed in the Australian Region, between 90°E and 160°E, outside of the official season. The World Meteorological Organization currently defines the season as occurring between 1 November and 30 April of the following year, which is when the majority of all tropical cyclones exist. During the off-season, systems are more likely to either develop during or persist until May, with approximately 52% of such storms occurring during that month. Occasionally, however, storms develop in October, with approximately 34% of such storms occurring during that month. As of 2022, there have been 94 tropical cyclones known to have occurred off-season.

Off-season cyclones are most likely to occur in the Coral Sea, with most affecting land in some way. Cumulatively, at least 4 deaths occurred due to the storms, the most recent off-season storm was Tropical Low 93S in September 2025.

== Systems ==
The wind speeds listed are maximum ten-minute average sustained winds, while the pressure is the minimum barometric pressure, both of which are estimates taken from the archives of either Météo-France, the Australian Bureau of Meteorology, the Fiji Meteorological Service, and New Zealand's MetService. If there are no known estimates of either the winds or pressure then the system is listed as "Not specified" under winds or pressure, if there is no known estimated winds or pressure. For deaths and damages "None" indicates that there were no reports of fatalities, although such storms may have impacted land. The damage totals are the United States dollar of the year of the storm.

Name	Dates	Peak intensity			Areas affected	Damage (USD)	Deaths	Ref(s).
Name	Dates	Category	Wind speed	Pressure	Areas affected	Damage (USD)	Deaths	Ref(s).
Unnamed	4 – 8 May 1898	Not specified	Not specified	Not specified	N/A	N/A	N/A	
Unnamed	7 – 10 July 1904	Not specified	Not specified	Not specified	New South Wales	None	None	
Unnamed	25 April – 2 May 1908	Not specified	Not specified	Not specified	Western Australia, Tasmania	None	None	
Unnamed	27 April – 2 May 1908	Not specified	Not specified	Not specified	Indonesia	None	None	
Unnamed	11–16 July 1912	Not specified	Not specified	Not specified	Queensland, New Zealand	None	None	
Unnamed	14–20 May 1919	Not specified	Not specified	Not specified	New Zealand	None	None	
Unnamed	1–2 July 1921	Not specified	Not specified	Not specified	Queensland	None	None	
Unnamed	20–28 July 1921	Not specified	Not specified	Not specified	Queensland, New Zealand	None	None	
Unnamed	1–6 October 1921	Not specified	Not specified	Not specified	Queensland, New Zealand	None	None	
Unnamed	1–7 June 1925	Not specified	Not specified	Not specified	Queensland	None	None	
Unnamed	1–6 May 1926	Not specified	Not specified	Not specified	Queensland	None	None	
05U	15–20 May 1926	Not specified	Not specified	999 hPa (29.50 inHg)	Queensland	None	None	
Unnamed	1–4 June 1929	Not specified	Not specified	Not specified	Queensland	None	None	
09U	13–17 June 1929	Not specified	Not specified	996 hPa (29.41 inHg)	None	None	None	
Unnamed	1–4 July 1932	Not specified	Not specified	Not specified	Queensland	None	None	
Unnamed	1–4 July 1934	Not specified	Not specified	Not specified	Queensland	None	None	
06U	24–27 May 1935	Not specified	Not specified	1002 hPa (29.59 inHg)	None	None	None	
Unnamed	30 August – 3 September 1935	Not specified	Not specified	999 hPa (29.50 inHg)	Queensland	None	None	
03U	28–30 May 1941	Not specified	Not specified	999 hPa (29.50 inHg)	Queensland	None	None	
09U	29 April – 1 May 1948	Not specified	Not specified	Not specified	Queensland	None	None	
01U	26–28 October 1952	Not specified	Not specified	998 hPa (29.47 inHg)	None	None	None	
20U	30 April – 1 May 1956	Not specified	Not specified	994 hPa (29.35 inHg)	None	None	None	
01U	29–30 August 1956	Not specified	Not specified	Not specified	None	None	None	
02U	26 October – 1 November 1956	Not specified	Not specified	1004 hPa (29.65 inHg)	None	None	None	
32P	4–15 June 1958	Not specified	Not specified	988 hPa (29.18 inHg)	Solomon Islands, New Caledonia; New Zealand	None	None	
18U	4–12 June 1958	Not specified	Not specified	986 hPa (29.12 inHg)	Queensland	None	None	
33P	19–22 June 1958	Not specified	Not specified	Not specified	Queensland	None	None	
24P	24–29 May 1960	Not specified	Not specified	Not specified	Queensland	None	None	
15U	15–21 July 1960	Not specified	Not specified	995 hPa (29.38 inHg)	None	None	None	
49P	3–9 May 1963	Not specified	Not specified	Not specified	Solomon Islands, Queensland	None	None	
32U	2–9 May 1963	Not specified	Not specified	1007 hPa (29.74 inHg)	Solomon Islands, Queensland	None	None	
33U	6–13 May 1963	Not specified	Not specified	1009 hPa (29.80 inHg)	None	None	None	
34U	7–8 May 1963	Not specified	Not specified	1000 hPa (29.53 inHg)	None	None	None	
35U	7–14 May 1963	Not specified	Not specified	1000 hPa (29.53 inHg)	Solomon Islands, Vanuatu; New Caledonia	None	None	
53P	10–12 May 1963	Not specified	Not specified	Not specified	New Caledonia	None	None	
37U	22–25 June 1963	Not specified	Not specified	1,001 hPa (29.56 inHg)	New Caledonia	None	None	
38U	23 June – 4 July 1963	Not specified	Not specified	986 hPa (29.12 inHg)	New Caledonia	None	None	
Esther	26 April – 2 May 1969	Not specified	Not specified	992 hPa (29.29 inHg)	Papua New Guinea	None	None	
Lulu	4–9 May 1970	Unknown	Unknown	996 hPa (29.41 inHg)	Western Australia	None	None	
32P	22–23 June 1970	Not specified	Not specified	Not specified	None	None	None	
Hannah	7–11 May 1972	Category 3 severe tropical cyclone	130 km/h (80 mph)	965 hPa (28.50 inHg)	Solomon Islands, Papua New Guinea	None	None	
Ida	30 May – 1 June 1972	Category 3 severe tropical cyclone	130 km/h (80 mph)	965 hPa (28.50 inHg)	Solomon Islands, New Caledonia			
Marcelle	29 April – 9 May 1973	Category 3 severe tropical cyclone	130 km/h (80 mph)	973 hPa (28.73 inHg)	South-Western Australia	None	None	
02P	8–14 July 1973	Not specified	Not specified	Not specified	Queensland	None	None	
Marcia	17–25 October 1974	Category 2 tropical cyclone	95 km/h (60 mph)	988 hPa (29.18 inHg)	Cocos Island	None	None	
Unnamed	17–19 October 1974	Tropical depression	Not specified	Not Specified	None	None	None	
Norah	28 October – 4 November 1974	Category 2 tropical cyclone	100 km/h (65 mph)	981 hPa (28.97 inHg)	Christmas Island, Cocos Island	None	None	
Denise	19–25 May 1975	Category 1 tropical cyclone	75 km/h (45 mph)	992 hPa (29.29 inHg)	Cocos Island	Minor	None	
Carol	3–9 May 1976	Category 2 tropical cyclone	95 km/h (60 mph)	990 hPa (29.23 inHg)	None	None	None	
Verna	28 April – 3 May 1977	Category 3 severe tropical cyclone	130 km/h (80 mph)	973 hPa (28.73 inHg)	Northern Territory	None	None	
Kevin	2–12 May 1979	Category 1 tropical cyclone	85 km/h (50 mph)	985 hPa (29.09 inHg)	None	None	None	
Paddy	25–30 May 1981	Category 3 severe tropical cyclone	120 km/h (75 mph)	973 hPa (28.73 inHg)	Western Australia	None	None	
Alex	19–27 October 1981	Category 3 severe tropical cyclone	150 km/h (90 mph)	964 hPa (28.47 inHg)	None	None	None	
Claudia	13–18 May 1982	Category 1 tropical cyclone	75 km/h (45 mph)	990 hPa (29.23 inHg)	Solomon Islands	None	None	
Naomi	21 April – 2 May 1983	Category 3 severe tropical cyclone	150 km/h (90 mph)	960 hPa (28.35 inHg)	None	None	None	
Oscar	22 October – 1 November 1983	Category 3 severe tropical cyclone	140 km/h (85 mph)	968 hPa (28.59 inHg)	None	None	None	
Billy – Lila	5–12 May 1986	Category 4 severe tropical cyclone	175 km/h (110 mph)	950 hPa (28.05 inHg)	Western Australia	None	None	
Namu	15–22 May 1986	Category 3 severe tropical cyclone	150 km/h (90 mph)	960 hPa (28.35 inHg)	Solomon Islands, Vanuatu, New Caledonia	$20 million	63-150	
Meena	1–10 May 1989	Category 1 tropical cyclone	85 km/h (50 mph)	990 hPa (29.23 inHg)	Cape York Peninsula	None	None	
Ernie	9 – 13 May 1989	Category 1 tropical cyclone	85 km/h (50 mph)	998 hPa (29.47 inHg)	Vanuatu, Solomon Islands, Papua New Guinea	Unknown	Unknown	
02S	14–16 July 1989	Tropical cyclone	Not specified	Not specified	None	None	None	
Lisa	7–11 May 1991	Category 2 tropical cyclone	110 km/h (70 mph)	975 hPa (28.79 inHg)	Solomon Islands, Vanuatu	None	None	
Adel	11 – 16 May	Category 3 severe tropical cyclone	120 km/h (75 mph)	970 hPa (28.64 inHg)	Papua New Guinea	Minimal	3	
Willy	26 April – 1 May 1994	Category 1 tropical cyclone	85 km/h (50 mph)	985 hPa (29.09 inHg)	Cocos Islands	None	None	
Jenna	1 – 6 May 1996	Category 2 tropical cyclone	100 km/h (65 mph)	984 hPa (29.06 inHg)	None	None	None	
Unnamed	30 April – 5 May 1996	Tropical low	85 km/h (50 mph)	Not specified	Queensland	None	None	
Rhonda	10–16 May 1997	Category 4 severe tropical cyclone	175 km/h (110 mph)	935 hPa (27.61 inHg)	Cocos Island, Western Australia	None	None	
Lindsay	9 – 13 July 1996	Category 1 tropical cyclone	75 km/h (45 mph)	990 hPa (29.23 inHg)	None	None	None	
Melanie – Bellamine	28 October – 1 November 1997	Category 2 tropical cyclone	95 km/h (60 mph)	990 hPa (29.23 inHg)	None	None	None	
Zelia	7–10 October 1998	Category 1 tropical cyclone	75 km/h (45 mph)	990 hPa (29.23 inHg)	None	None	None	
26F	20–27 May 1999	Tropical depression	75 km/h (45 mph)	995 hPa (29.38 inHg)	Queensland, New Zealand			
20F	26 April – 2 May 2000	Tropical depression	95 km/h (60 mph)	1000 hPa (29.53 inHg)	Queensland			
21F	28 April – 2 May 2000	Tropical depression	55 km/h (35 mph)	1000 hPa (29.53 inHg)	Queensland			
Alex – Andre	26–31 October 2001	Category 2 tropical cyclone	100 km/h (65 mph)	980 hPa (28.94 inHg)	None	None	None	
Errol	8–14 May 2002	Category 1 tropical cyclone	75 km/h (45 mph)	995 hPa (29.38 inHg)	None	None	None	
Upia	21 – 29 May 2002	Category 1 tropical cyclone	65 km/h (40 mph)	995 hPa (29.38 inHg)	Budelun Island	Unknown	Unknown	
Epi	5 – 6 June 2003	Category 1 tropical cyclone	65 km/h (40 mph)	993 hPa (29.32 inHg)	Papua New Guinea	Unknown	Unknown	
Phoebe	1 – 5 September 2004	Category 1 tropical cyclone	85 km/h (50 mph)	990 hPa (29.23 inHg)	None	None	None	
Pierre	15 – 23 May 2007	Category 1 tropical cyclone	75 km/h (45 mph)	990 hPa (29.23 inHg)	Solomon Islands, Papua New Guinea; Torres Straits	Unknown	Unknown	
01U/01S	26 July – 1 August 2007	Category 1 tropical cyclone	75 km/h (45 mph)	992 hPa (29.29 inHg)	None	None	None	
Kirrily	18 April – 1 May 2009	Category 1 tropical cyclone	75 km/h (45 mph)	998 hPa (29.47 inHg)	Indonesia	Unknown	Unknown	
24U	10 – 18 May 2009	Tropical low	45 km/h (30 mph)	1009 hPa (29.80 inHg)	None	None	None	
Anggrek	28 October – 4 November 2010	Tropical low	75 km/h (45 mph)	995 hPa (29.38 inHg)	Cocos (Keeling) Islands	None	None	(Note: Anggrek was declassified as a tropical cyclone during the post storm analysis by the BoM, as gale force winds never extended more than halfway around the system centre.)
19S	7 – 14 May 2012	Tropical depression	55 km/h (35 mph)	996 hPa (29.41 inHg)	Indonesia, East Timor	None	None	
21U/21P	27 June – 1 July 2012	Category 1 tropical cyclone	85 km/h (50 mph)	994 hPa (29.35 inHg)	Papua New Guinea	Unknown	None	
Zane	27 April – 1 May 2013	Category 3 severe tropical cyclone	120 km/h (75 mph)	981 hPa (28.97 inHg)	Papua New Guinea, Queensland	None	None	
Quang	27 April – 1 May 2015	Category 4 severe tropical cyclone	185 km/h (115 mph)	950 hPa (28.05 inHg)	Western Australia	Minor	None	
Raquel	30 June – 5 July 2015	Category 1 tropical cyclone	85 km/h (50 mph)	990 hPa (29.23 inHg)	Solomon Islands	Significant	1	
Frances	21 April – 1 May 2017	Category 3 severe tropical cyclone	120 km/h (75 mph)	980 hPa (28.94 inHg)	Papua New Guinea, Indonesia; East Timor	None	None	
Greg	29 April – 1 May 2017	Category 1 tropical cyclone	65 km/h (40 mph)	995 hPa (29.38 inHg)	None	None	None	
Lili	4 – 11 May 2019	Category 1 tropical cyclone	75 km/h (45 mph)	997 hPa (29.44 inHg)	Eastern Indonesia, East Timor, Top End	Unknown	Unknown	
Ann	9 – 18 May 2019	Category 2 tropical cyclone	100 km/h (65 mph)	990 hPa (29.23 inHg)	Solomon Islands, New Caledonia, Queensland	None	None	
TD	3 – 9 May 2020	Tropical depression	55 km/h (35 mph)	1004 hPa (29.65 inHg)	Western Indonesia, Christmas Island, Cocos Islands	None	None	
Mangga	19 - 23 May 2020	Tropical Low	65 km/h (40 mph)	996 hPa (29.41 inHg)	Western Australia	Unknown	Unknown	
TL	31 May – 4 June 2021	Tropical Low	Not specified	Not specified	None	None	None	
Karim	7 – 11 May 2022	Category 2 tropical cyclone	110 km/h (70 mph)	982 hPa (29.00 inHg)	None	None	None	
TL	28 – 31 May 2022	Tropical Low	Not specified	1004 hPa (29.65 inHg)	Christmas Island, Western Australia	None	None	
01U	26 – 31 July 2022	Category 1 tropical cyclone	85 km/h (50 mph)	994 hPa (29.35 inHg)	Cocos Islands	None	None	
TL	28 April – 2 May 2023	Tropical Low	Not specified	Not specified	Christmas Island	None	None	
16U	4 – 5 May 2024	Tropical Low	Not specified	1004 hPa (29.65 inHg)	None	None	None	
33U	9 – 12 May 2025	Tropical Low	65 km/h (40 mph)	1000 hPa (29.53 inHg)	Papua New Guinea, Eastern Indonesia	None	None	
34U	11 – 14 May 2025	Tropical Low	45 km/h (30 mph)	1003 hPa (29.62 inHg)	Solomon Islands	None	None	
TL	15 – 16 July 2025	Tropical Low	55 km/h (35 mph)	1003 hPa (29.62 inHg)	None	None	None	
TL	2 – 5 August 2025	Tropical Low	55 km/h (35 mph)	1005 hPa (29.68 inHg)	None	None	None	
TL	9 – 12 September 2025	Tropical Low	55 km/h (35 mph)	1003 hPa (29.62 inHg)	None	None	None	
TL	19 – 22 October 2025	Tropical Low	55 km/h (35 mph)	1003 hPa (29.62 inHg)	None	None	None	

=== Systems by month ===
Number of recorded off-season cyclones by month
Month	Number of cyclones
April (Note: The April statistic only show those systems that formed during the month and either dissipated on 30 April, or persisted into the off-season.)	16
May	39
June	12
July	12
August	2
September	2
October	12

== See also ==
- List of off-season Atlantic hurricanes
- List of off-season Pacific hurricanes
- List of off-season South Pacific tropical cyclones
- List of off-season South-West Indian Ocean tropical cyclones
