= List of off-season South Pacific tropical cyclones =

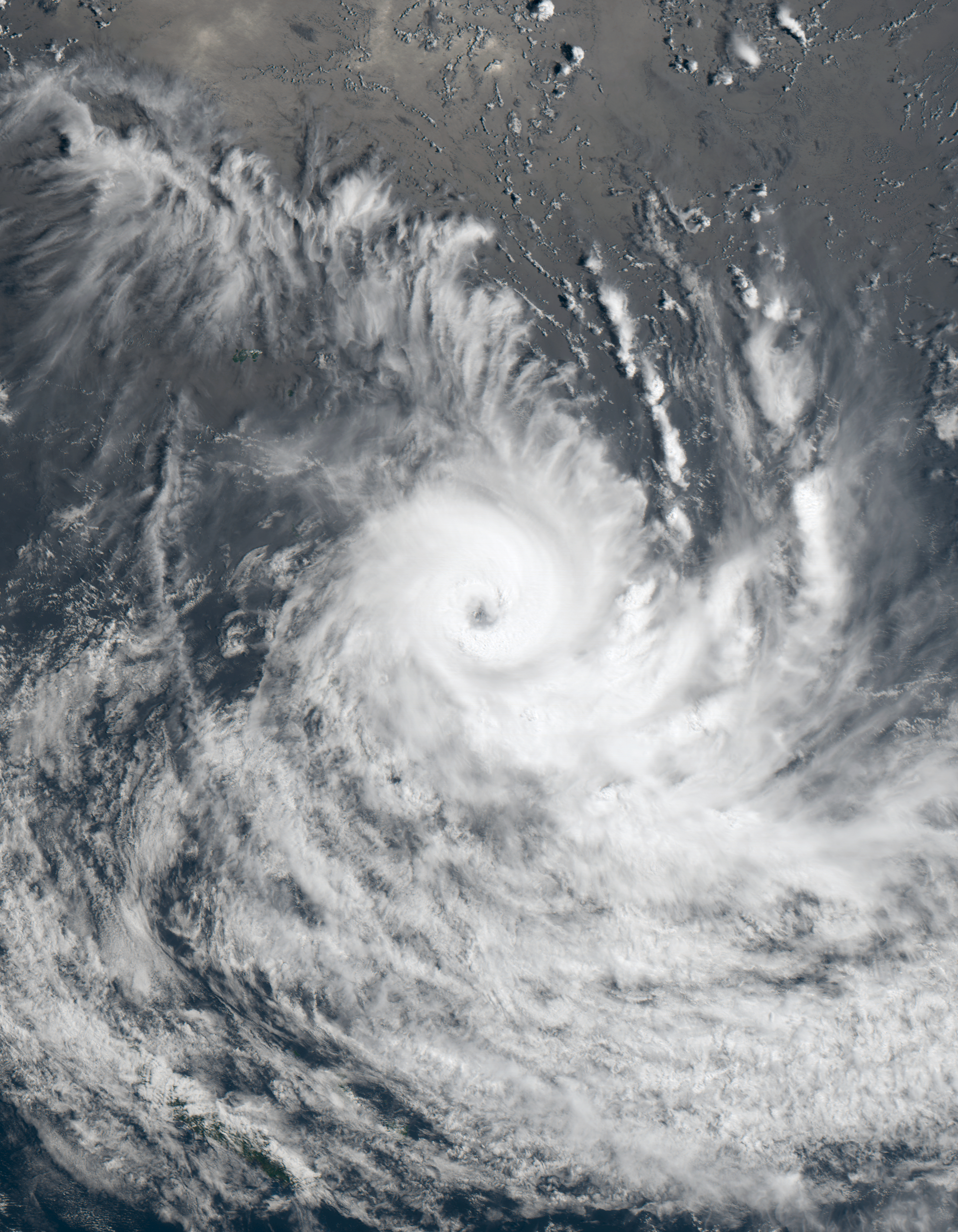
Cyclone Lola at peak strength on 24 October 2023

An off-season South Pacific tropical cyclone is a tropical cyclone that exists in the South Pacific basin outside of the official tropical cyclone season. The World Meteorological Organization currently defines the season as occurring between November 1 and April 30, of the following year, with approximately 96% of all activity occurring between these months. If a tropical cyclone should develop during the off-season, it is more likely to develop during May or October than any other month of the off-season. The official database provided by the International Best Track Archive for Climate Stewardship, which dates back to 1892, shows that 56 tropical cyclones have existed in the basin during the off-season between May and October, while in addition 36 other systems that are not included in IBTRACS have monitored by the warning centres.

Off-season cyclones are most likely to occur in the Coral Sea, with most impacting either the Solomon Islands, Vanuatu and New Caledonia. The most recent off-season storm was Tropical Cyclone Wati, which formed on October 14, 2026 and impacted the Cook Islands and French Polynesia. The strongest tropical cyclone to exist during the off-season was Severe Tropical Cyclone Lola of 2023, with maximum 10–minute sustained winds of 130 mph (215 km/h), and an estimated value of 930 hPa (27.46 inHg) of central pressure. The deadliest and most damaging system was Severe Tropical Cyclone Namu, which caused over 100 deaths, when it impacted the Solomon Islands during May 1986.

== Background ==
Tropical cyclones are considered to be non-frontal, low pressure systems that develop, within an environment of warm sea surface temperatures and little vertical wind shear aloft.

Within the South Pacific basin to the east of 160°E, the cyclone season is defined as running between November 1 and April 30 of the following year. During the off-season a total of 91 tropical cyclones have been recorded during the off-season, with a total of 54 of these systems occurring after satellite imagery became regularly available during the 1969–70 season. (Note: Regular satellite imagery of the basin became available during the 1969–70 season, thus the 1969–70 season is considered the start of the satellite era.)

The first system to exist in the off-season on record was active during May 17, 1868 and was located near Vanuatu, according to records compiled by Stephen Sargent Visher. However, the official database shows that the first storm to occur in the basin outside of the current season was in 1912. The most recent systems to exist in the off-season were Severe Tropical Cyclone Lola, which developed during October 2023. The strongest tropical cyclones to exist during the off-season in terms of wind speed was Severe Tropical Cyclone Donna of 2017 and Severe Tropical Cyclone Lola of 2023, with maximum 10–minute sustained winds of 125 mph (205 km/h), while the most intense by central pressure was Severe Tropical Cyclone Xavier of 2006, with a minimum value of 930 hPa (27.46 inHg). The deadliest and most damaging system was Severe Tropical Cyclone Namu, which caused over 100 deaths, when it impacted the Solomon Islands during May 1986.

Of the 57 known tropical systems that have been recorded during the off-season, a total of 33 tropical cyclones have been recorded in May or have persisted into the off-season after developing in April. A total of 18 tropical cyclones have developed during October, while three systems have been recorded in both June and July, while two have been recorded in September. The three systems recorded in June were all named tropical cyclones, with Gina and Keli considered to be a Category 3 severe tropical cyclones on the Australian tropical cyclone intensity scale. In addition Tropical Cyclone Raquel developed in June 2015 and was considered to be the latest system to develop in the South Pacific Ocean. In addition as the system persisted into July 2015, it was unofficially considered to be a part of two tropical cyclone years. Off the two systems recorded in July, Tropical Depression 17F in July 2002 was designated 17F, despite being the first system of the 2002–03 season. Tropical Depression 01F/01P of July 2015, which subsequently persisted into August 2015. The first system that developed during September was an unnamed system that occurred in 1924, which according to a report published by Greenpeace, caused damage to some ships to the west of New Caledonia. The other system was declared to be a tropical depression by the Fiji Meteorological Service during September 1999, but was more likely to be a hybrid system rather than a proper tropical depression.

The season with the most off-season systems was 1999–2000, which had a total of six tropical depressions existing during the off-season. The 1997–98, 2004–05 and 2013–14 seasons had four tropical cyclones during the off-season each, while the 1988–89 and the 1996–97 season had three off-season tropical cyclones.

== Systems ==
The wind speeds listed are maximum ten-minute average sustained winds, while the pressure is the minimum barometric pressure, both of which are estimates taken from the archives of either the Australian Bureau of Meteorology, the Fiji Meteorological Service, and New Zealand's MetService. If there are no known estimates of either the winds or pressure then the system is listed as "Not specified" under winds or pressure, if there is no known estimated winds or pressure. For deaths and damages "None" indicates that there were no reports of fatalities or damages, although such storms may have impacted land. Where it The damage totals are the United States dollar of the year of the storm.

Name	Dates	Peak intensity			Areas affected	Damage (USD)	Deaths	Ref(s).
Name	Dates	Category	Wind speed	Pressure	Areas affected	Damage (USD)	Deaths	Ref(s).
Unnamed	October 5 – 6, 1847	Not Specified	Not Specified	Not Specified	Norfolk Island	None	None	
Unnamed	May 17, 1868	Not Specified	Not Specified	Not Specified	Unknown	None	None	
Unnamed	October 2, 1874	Not Specified	Not Specified	Not Specified	Unknown	None	None	
Unnamed	May 5 – 8, 1912	Not Specified	Not Specified	Not Specified	New Caledonia	None	None	
Unnamed	June 20 – 26, 1912	Not Specified	Not Specified	Not Specified	French Polynesia	None	None	
Unnamed	July 11 – 16, 1912	Not Specified	Not Specified	Not Specified	Queensland, New Zealand	None	None	
Unnamed	May 5 – 11, 1916	Not Specified	Not Specified	Not Specified	New Caledonia	None	None	
Unnamed	May 24 – 29, 1916	Not Specified	Not Specified	Not Specified	New Zealand	None	None	
Unnamed	May 14 – 20, 1919	Not Specified	Not Specified	Not Specified	New Zealand	None	None	
Unnamed	July 28, 1919	Not Specified	Not Specified	Not Specified	Unknown	None	None	
Unnamed	October 28 – 30, 1919	Not Specified	Not Specified	Not Specified	Unknown	None	None	
Unnamed	July 20 – 28, 1921	Not Specified	Not Specified	Not Specified	Queensland, New Zealand	None	None	
Unnamed	October 1 – 6, 1921	Not Specified	Not Specified	Not Specified	Queensland, New Zealand	None	None	
Unnamed	September 1924	Not Specified	Not Specified	Not Specified	Unknown	None	None	
Unnamed	June 1 – 7, 1925	Not Specified	Not Specified	Not Specified	Queensland	None	None	
Unnamed	May 1 – 6, 1926	Not Specified	Not Specified	Not Specified	Queensland	None	None	
Unnamed	May 15 – 20, 1926	Tropical Low	Not Specified	999 hPa (29.50 inHg)	Queensland	None	None	
Unnamed	May 26, 1926	Not Specified	Not Specified	Not Specified	Fiji	Minor	None	
Unnamed	June 1 – 4, 1929	Not Specified	Not Specified	Not Specified	Queensland	None	None	
Unnamed	July 1 – 4, 1931	Not Specified	Not Specified	Not Specified	Queensland	None	None	
Unnamed	July 1 – 4, 1934	Not Specified	Not Specified	Not Specified	Queensland	None	None	
Unnamed	May 24 – 27, 1935	Tropical Low	Not Specified	1002 hPa (29.59 inHg)	None	None	None	
Unnamed	August 30 – September 3, 1935	Not Specified	Not Specified	999 hPa (29.50 inHg)	Queensland	None	None	
Unnamed	July 1 – 5, 1936	Not Specified	Not Specified	Not Specified	None	None	None	
Unnamed	July 7 – 10, 1936	Not Specified	Not Specified	1002 hPa (29.59 inHg)	None	None	None	
Unnamed	August 19 – 23, 1950	Category 2 tropical cyclone	95 km/h (60 mph)	Not Specified	None	None	None	
Unnamed	September 12 – 17, 1950	Category 2 tropical cyclone	110 km/h (70 mph)	Not Specified	New Caledonia	None	None	
Unnamed	October 26 – 29, 1952	Not Specified	Not Specified	998 hPa (29.47 inHg)	None	None	None	
Unnamed	June 4 – 15, 1958	Not Specified	Not Specified	988 hPa (29.18 inHg)	Solomon Islands, New Caledonia; New Zealand	None	None	
Unnamed	June 4 – 12, 1958	Not Specified	Not Specified	986 hPa (29.12 inHg)	Queensland	None	None	
Unnamed	May 24 – 29, 1960	Not Specified	Not Specified	Not Specified	Queensland	None	None	
Unnamed	May 2 – 9, 1963	Not Specified	Not Specified	1007 hPa (29.74 inHg)	Solomon Islands, Queensland	None	None	
Unnamed	May 7 – 14, 1963	Not Specified	Not Specified	1000 hPa (29.53 inHg)	Solomon Islands, Vanuatu; New Caledonia	None	None	
Unnamed	May 10 – 12, 1963	Not Specified	Not Specified	Not Specified	New Caledonia	None	None	
Unnamed	June 22 – 25, 1963	Not Specified	Not Specified	1001 hPa (29.56 inHg)	New Caledonia	None	None	
Unnamed	June 23 – July 4, 1963	Not Specified	Not Specified	986 hPa (29.12 inHg)	New Caledonia	None	None	
Esther	April 26 – May 2, 1969	Not Specified	Not Specified	992 hPa (29.29 inHg)	Papua New Guinea	None	None	
Unnamed	June 22 – 23, 1970	Not Specified	Not Specified	Not Specified	None	None	None	
Nora	October 29 – 30, 1970	Tropical depression	Not Specified	Not Specified	Fiji	Minor	None	
Ida	May 29 – June 5, 1972	Category 3 severe tropical cyclone	120 km/h (75 mph)	965 hPa (28.50 inHg)	Solomon Islands, Vanuatu; New Caledonia	70 million	3	
Bebe	October 19 – 28, 1972	Category 3 severe tropical cyclone	155 km/h (100 mph)	945 hPa (27.91 inHg)	Fiji, Kiribati, Tuvalu	22.5 million	27	
Unnamed	July 7 – 10, 1973	Not Specified	Not Specified	Not Specified	New Caledonia	None	None	
Unnamed	July 8 – 14, 1973	Not Specified	Not Specified	Not Specified	Queensland	None	None	
Unnamed	July 31 – August 4, 1976	Not Specified	Not Specified	Not Specified	None	None	None	
Claudia	May 13 – 18, 1981	Category 1 tropical cyclone	75 km/h (45 mph)	990 hPa (29.23 inHg)	Solomon Islands	None	None	
Joti	October 31 – November 7, 1982	Category 2 tropical cyclone	110 km/h (70 mph)	975 hPa (28.79 inHg)	Vanuatu	Minor	None	
Unnamed	May 11, 1983	Tropical depression	Not Specified	Not Specified	None	None	None	
Unnamed	May 16, 1983	Tropical depression	Not Specified	Not Specified	None	None	None	
Namu	May 15 – 22, 1986	Category 3 severe tropical cyclone	150 km/h (90 mph)	955 hPa (28.20 inHg)	Solomon Islands	20 million	111	
Blanch(e)	May 20 – 27, 1987	Category 1 tropical cyclone	75 km/h (45 mph)	990 hPa (29.23 inHg)	Solomon Islands	None	None	
Meena	May 1 – 10, 1989	Category 1 tropical cyclone	85 km/h (50 mph)	990 hPa (29.23 inHg)	Cape York Peninsula	Minor	None	
Ernie	May 6 – 12, 1989	Category 1 tropical cyclone	85 km/h (50 mph)	990 hPa (29.23 inHg)	None	None	None	
Unnamed	May 28 – 30, 1989	Tropical depression	Not Specified	Not Specified	Fiji	None	None	
Lisa	May 7 – 19, 1991	Category 2 tropical cyclone	110 km/h (70 mph)	975 hPa (28.79 inHg)	Solomon Islands, Vanuatu	None	None	
Innis	April 27 – May 6, 1992	Category 2 tropical cyclone	95 km/h (60 mph)	985 hPa (29.09 inHg)	Solomon Islands, Vanuatu	None	None	
June	May 2 – 11, 1997	Category 2 tropical cyclone	95 km/h (60 mph)	985 hPa (29.09 inHg)	Fiji	60 million	None	
37P	May 28 – 30, 1997	Tropical cyclone	Not Specified	997 hPa (29.44 inHg)	Vanuatu	None	None	(Note: Data on 37P was taken from the United States Joint Typhoon Warning Center.)
Keli	June 7 – 17, 1997	Category 3 severe tropical cyclone	150 km/h (90 mph)	955 hPa (28.20 inHg)	Tuvalu, Fiji, Samoan islands	10,000	None	
Lusi	October 8 – 12, 1997	Category 2 tropical cyclone	100 km/h (65 mph)	985 hPa (29.09 inHg)	Vanuatu, Fiji	None	None	
03P	October 26 – 28, 1997	Tropical depression	Not Specified	997 hPa (29.44 inHg)	None	None	None	
Martin	October 27 – November 5, 1997	Category 3 severe tropical cyclone	155 km/h (100 mph)	945 hPa (27.91 inHg)	Cook Islands, French Polynesia	$8 million	28	
Bart	April 28 – May 3, 1998	Category 1 tropical cyclone	85 km/h (50 mph)	987 hPa (29.15 inHg)	French Polynesia	Minor	10	
26F	May 20 – 26, 1999	Tropical depression	75 km/h (45 mph)	995 hPa (29.38 inHg)	Queensland, New Zealand	None	None	
20F	April 26 – May 2, 2000	Tropical depression	95 km/h (60 mph)	1000 hPa (29.53 inHg)	Queensland	None	None	
21F	April 28 – May 2, 2000	Tropical depression	65 km/h (40 mph)	1000 hPa (29.53 inHg)	Queensland	None	None	
22F	May 3 – 8, 2000	Tropical depression	75 km/h (45 mph)	1001 hPa (29.56 inHg)	None	None	None	
23F	May 6, 2000	Tropical depression	Not Specified	Not Specified	None	None	None	
24F	May 20 – 23, 2000	Tropical depression	75 km/h (45 mph)	1002 hPa (29.59 inHg)	None	None	None	
14F	May 1 – 3, 2001	Tropical depression	75 km/h (45 mph)	1004 hPa (29.65 inHg)	None	None	None	
15F	May 7 – 9, 2001	Tropical depression	65 km/h (40 mph)	999 hPa (29.50 inHg)	None	None	None	
17F	July 3 – 4, 2002	Tropical depression	Not Specified	995 hPa (29.38 inHg)	None	None	None	
01F	October 21 – 22, 2002	Tropical depression	Not Specified	1002 hPa (29.59 inHg)	Vanuatu	None	None	
Gina	June 4 – 9, 2003	Category 3 severe tropical cyclone	150 km/h (90 mph)	950 hPa (28.05 inHg)	Solomon Islands	None	None	
01F	October 28 – 30, 2004	Tropical depression	Not Specified	1001 hPa (29.56 inHg)	Solomon Islands	None	None	
14F	April 14 – May 1, 2005	Tropical depression	Not Specified	1000 hPa (29.53 inHg)	None	None	None	
17F	April 26 – May 1, 2005	Tropical depression	Not Specified	1007 hPa (29.74 inHg)	None	None	None	
18F	April 29 – May 1, 2005	Tropical depression	Not Specified	1006 hPa (29.71 inHg)	None	None	None	
Xavier	October 20 – 26, 2006	Category 4 severe tropical cyclone	175 km/h (110 mph)	930 hPa (27.46 inHg)	Solomon Islands, Vanuatu	Minimal	None	
02F	October 24 – 29, 2006	Tropical depression	Not Specified	1004 hPa (29.65 inHg)	None	None	None	
01F	October 16 – 19, 2007	Tropical depression	Not Specified	1000 hPa (29.53 inHg)	Solomon Islands	None	None	
17F	May 10 – 11, 2011	Tropical depression	Not Specified	1006 hPa (29.71 inHg)	None	None	None	
22F	April 28 – May 1, 2013	Tropical disturbance	Not Specified	993 hPa (29.32 inHg)	Fiji	None	None	
01F	October 19 – 20, 2013	Tropical disturbance	Not Specified	1004 hPa (29.65 inHg)	Solomon Islands	None	None	
02F	October 19 – 23, 2013	Tropical depression	Not Specified	1002 hPa (29.59 inHg)	Vanuatu	Minor	None	
03F	October 21 – 22, 2013	Tropical depression	Not Specified	1005 hPa (29.68 inHg)	Solomon Islands	None	None	
04F	October 25 – 27, 2013	Tropical depression	Not Specified	1007 hPa (29.74 inHg)	Solomon Islands	None	None	
Raquel	June 28 – July 5, 2015	Category 1 tropical cyclone	65 km/h (40 mph)	995 hPa (29.38 inHg)	Solomon Islands	Significant	1	
01F	July 29 – August 4, 2015	Tropical depression	Not Specified	1007 hPa (29.74 inHg)	Solomon Islands	None	None	
02F	October 12 – 18, 2015	Tropical depression	45 km/h (30 mph)	1001 hPa (29.56 inHg)	Vanuatu	None	None	
Donna	May 1 – 10, 2017	Category 5 severe tropical cyclone	205 km/h (125 mph)	935 hPa (27.61 inHg)	Solomon Islands, Vanuatu; New Caledonia, New Zealand	Significant	2	
Ella	May 7 – 14, 2017	Category 2 tropical cyclone	110 km/h (70 mph)	977 hPa (28.85 inHg)	Samoan Islands, Tonga; Wallis and Futuna, Fiji	Minor	None	
Liua	September 26 – 28, 2018	Category 1 tropical cyclone	75 km/h (45 mph)	994 hPa (29.35 inHg)	Solomon Islands	None	0	
12F	May 16 – 21, 2019	Tropical disturbance	Not Specified	1004 hPa (29.65 inHg)	None	None	0	
Gina	May 16 – 21, 2022	Category 1 tropical cyclone	75 km/h (45 mph)	998 hPa (29.47 inHg)	Vanuatu	Unknown	Unknown	
Lola	October 19 –27, 2023	Category 5 severe tropical cyclone	215 km/h (130 mph)	930 hPa (27.46 inHg)	Solomon Islands, Vanuatu			
Wati	October 14 – 19, 2026	Category 2 tropical cyclone	100 km/h (65 mph)	975 hPa (28.79 inHg)	Cook Islands, French Polynesia			

== Systems by month ==
Off-season systems are most likely to occur in May, with a total of 43 systems developing or persisting into the month, during October, when 22 have formed. By contrast, only 2 systems have developed in August and 4 in September.

Number of recorded off-season cyclones by month
Month	Number of cyclones
April (Note: The April statistic only show those systems that formed during the month and either dissipated on 30 April, or persisted into the off-season.)	9
May	36
June	12
July	12
August	2
September	4
October	22

== See also ==
- List of off-season Atlantic hurricanes
- List of off-season Australian region tropical cyclones
- List of off-season Pacific hurricanes
- List of off-season South-West Indian Ocean tropical cyclones
