= Hurricane Nina (1957) =

Category 1 Pacific hurricane in 1957

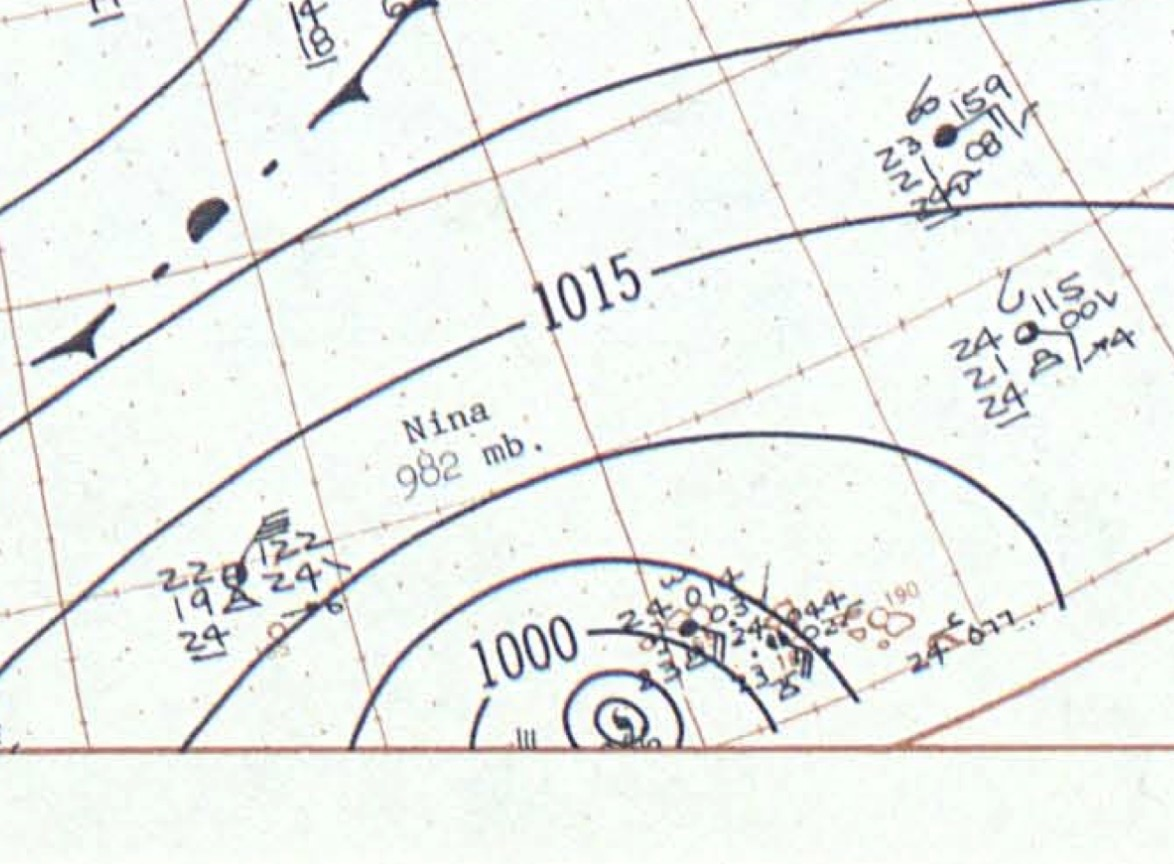
- Weather map of Hurricane Nina at its closest approach to the Hawaiian Islands on December 2

Meteorological history
- Formed: November 29, 1957
- Dissipated: December 6, 1957

Category 1 hurricane
- 1-minute sustained (SSHWS/NWS)
- Highest winds: 85 mph (140 km/h)
- Lowest pressure: ≤1002 mbar (hPa); ≤29.59 inHg

Overall effects
- Fatalities: 4 direct
- Damage: $100,000
- Areas affected: Hawaii
- Part of the 1957 Pacific hurricane season

Hurricane Nina was the final tropical storm and hurricane of the 1957 Pacific hurricane season and the last storm to form during the active Central Pacific hurricane season this year. This storm was named "Nina" because during this time, hurricanes in this basin were given names from the typhoon naming lists. This storm was the last to form during a series of typhoons and hurricanes to form in the Pacific in November.

Nina never made landfall while active, although some forecasts called for Nina to be the first hurricane to make landfall on Hawaii, but the hurricane veered west before landing. However, it came close enough to Hawaii to cause light damage and prompt evacuations. Nina was the first hurricane to affect the island of Kauai at that intensity. This storm was preceded by a winter storm that caused damaging surf along the north coast of Kauai and was both preceded and proceeded by cold fronts sweeping over Hawaii.

== Meteorological history ==
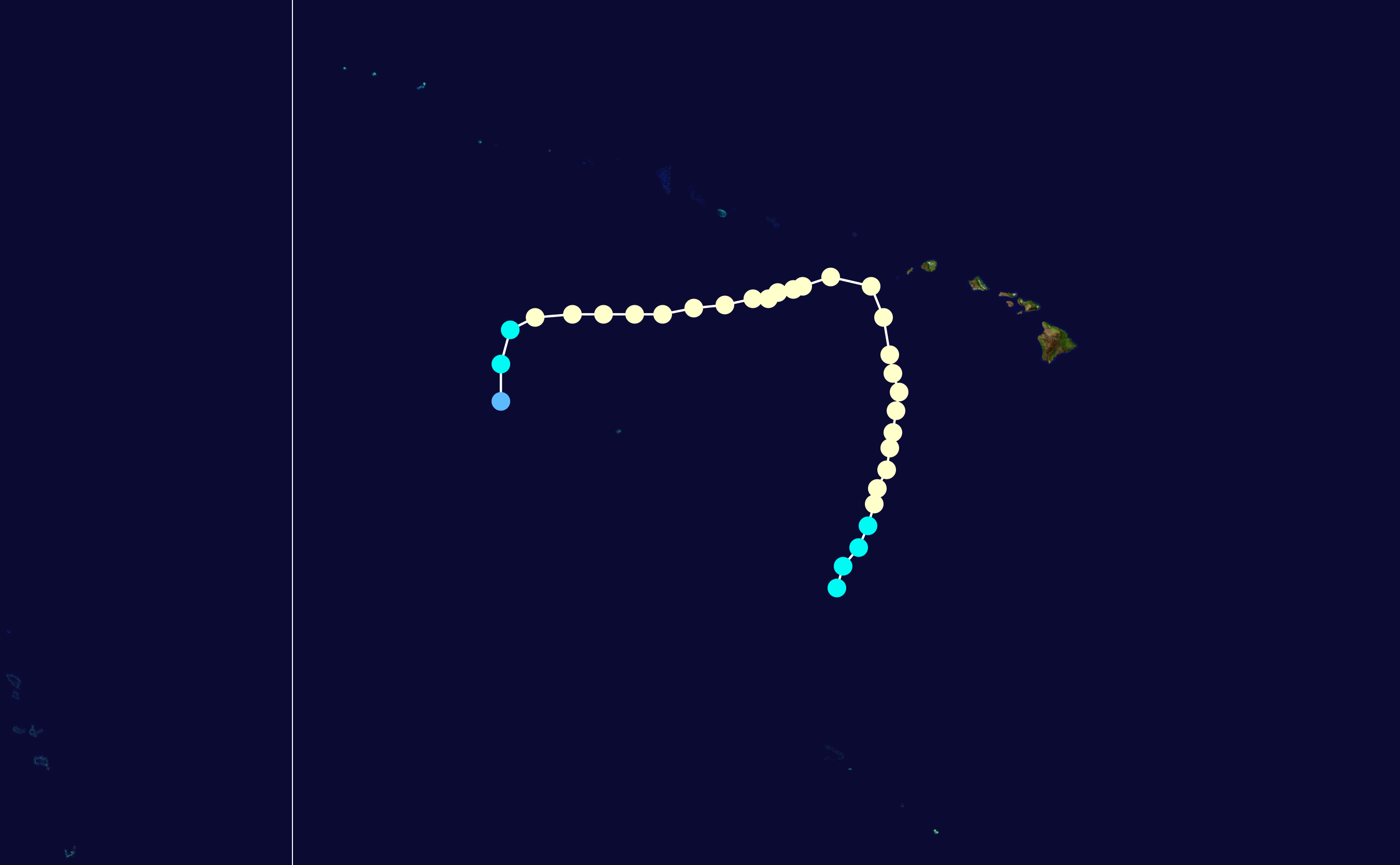
Map plotting the storm's track and intensity, according to the Saffir–Simpson scale Map key Saffir–Simpson scale Tropical depression (≤38 mph, ≤62 km/h) Tropical storm (39–73 mph, 63–118 km/h) Category 1 (74–95 mph, 119–153 km/h) Category 2 (96–110 mph, 154–177 km/h) Category 3 (111–129 mph, 178–208 km/h) Category 4 (130–156 mph, 209–251 km/h) Category 5 (≥157 mph, ≥252 km/h) Unknown Storm type Tropical cyclone Subtropical cyclone Extratropical cyclone, remnant low, tropical disturbance, or monsoon depression

On November 29 a disturbance in the ITCZ began gaining organization near Palmyra Island, which the ITCZ had been near for a week prior. The weather station on the island reported southwestern surface winds of 50 mph and a pressure of 1002.7 mbar and that during the night, the wind velocity peaked at 70 mph. Because of an irregular schedule for reporting, the last report received from the weather station, obtained eighteen hours earlier, had reported only small winds and 1004.7 mb pressure. Most noteworthy about this report was the 3-hour pressure tendency, which reported -3.2 mbar. Post-analysis revealed that this tendency was an indication of tropical cyclone development.

After receiving the second report on the 29th, warnings were immediately put out on the cyclone, which was given the name "Nina" from the typhoon list. For 24 hours, the center of the storm was reported to be stationary as the weather on Palmyra was continuously abnormal, but the next day, an aircraft from the Air Force showed that the storm was 500 miles north of the island and that it had intensified to hurricane strength. After six more hours, Nina's forward speed had quickly slowed 16 mph while the storm began a northward track, heading towards Kauai, but before reaching the island, the storm turned first to the north-northwest on December 2 and then sharply to the west later that day.

On December 4 Nina had reached its peak intensity of 85 mph. At this time, a polar high pressure system moved off the coast of Japan. The system reached Nina on December 6 and forced the hurricane into a southward path. Twenty hours after the turn, the cold air from the system got trapped inside the circulation of Nina and caused the storm to rapidly dissipate. The last advisory on the system was issued early on December 7 while Nina was at depression strength south of Midway Atoll.

== Preparations ==
Despite never moving onto land, Nina's proximity to Hawaii and the forecasts for an imminent landfall resulted in massive evacuations. An estimated 300 people living in Hanapepe and Hanalei were forced to evacuate when the Hanalei River overflowed its banks. An estimated 1,500 people on Kauai were evacuated to higher ground, where the Red Cross had established seven evacuation centers for these people to evacuate to. In addition, thirteen members of the United States Coast Guard were evacuated from low-lying islands and harbors when they were threatened by rising tides triggered by the hurricane and the threat of flooding forced 420 military personnel and families in Waikiki's Ft. Derussy and Ft. Armstrong as well as those living in Ft. Kamehameha, near Pearl Harbor to leave for higher ground. 270 were housed in Tripler Army Hospital and a temporary shelter was opened in Ft. Shafter, both of which were on high ground. In anticipation of Nina, 85 planes were flown away from Barber's Point Naval Air Base to Midway and several commercial flights were cancelled until the storm had passed. There was also concern for the residents of the privately owned Niihau, the closest landmass to the center of Nina and 20 miles closer than Kauai. The island's only communications was by boat and most attempts at reaching the island failed due to high surf.

== Impact ==
Wettest tropical cyclones and their remnants in Hawaii Highest-known totals
Precipitation			Storm	Location	Ref.
Rank	mm	in	Storm	Location	Ref.
1	1473	58.00	Lane 2018	Kahūnā Falls, Hawaii	
2	1321	52.00	Hiki 1950	Kanalohuluhulu Ranger Station	
3	985	38.76	Paul 2000	Kapapala Ranch 36	
4	732	28.82	Hone 2024	Volcano Island	
5	635	25.00	Maggie 1970	Various stations	
6	519	20.42	Nina 1957	Wainiha	
7	516	20.33	Iwa 1982	Intake Wainiha 1086	
8	476	18.75	Fabio 1988	Papaikou Mauka 140.1	
9	387	15.25	Iselle 2014	Kulani NWR	
10	381	15.00	One-C 1994	Waiākea-Uka, Piihonua	

Despite the evacuations, Nina's closest approach to Hawaii was 120 miles away. However, it came close enough to bring winds and heavy rain to the islands. There were four deaths reported in connection to the storm. The first reported was on Oahu when Herman Palepana, a lineman in the Honolulu street department, was killed when he was electrocuted by a power line downed during Nina's passing. Soon after, a sampan called the Setsu Maru sent a distress call reporting that the boat was sinking 10 miles east of Niihau. Even though the Navy sent the submarine rescue vessel Couchal and conducted an air-seas search for the vessel, no trace of the sampan or the wreckage had been found. All three people aboard the boat were reported dead as a result. Another person in Hanapepe suffered a cut forehead from a tree that came through a window in his house. The phone lines to the county seat of Kauai County, Lihue, were broken during the hurricane. The Aloha Theater in Hanapepe had been flooded by up to three feet of water. Reports from the five major islands indicated that less than 50 homes had been damaged during the storm and roughly 12 of them being destroyed on Kauai alone. Another ship disaster occurred when the Greek freighter Margarita Chandris got caught in the storm's winds while heading to Honolulu from Kobe. A distress call from the ship described the ship as "out of control". The initial fears were that the winds from Nina would pull the ship closer to its center. These fears were made worse when the ship was found to be cargoless, making it easier to be moved by the waves. A later call said that the crew was unable to steer the ship. Three ships, the Rainier, the United States Coast Guard cutter Winnebago and the cargoliner President Monroe, were sent out to find and guide the Chandris to port. The Monroe finally found the freighter and guided it toward land until the Winnebago caught up. The cutter finally caught up to the Margarita Chandris and relieved the President Monroe and started planning to board and make repairs. Afterward, it was decided that the Margarita Chandris had enough fuel to drift into Honolulu alone. Nina's proximity also caused heavy rains, with 20.42 inches falling in Wainiha in 14 hours. Overall, Hurricane Nina was responsible for $100,000 in damages (1957 USD), mostly from heavy surf, some of which measured 35 feet high.

=== Records and naming ===
While Nina was near Honolulu, it caused unusually high winds. When wind gusts of 82 mph were recorded at Honolulu airport during the storm, it set the record for highest wind gust ever recorded in that city. This was the first and last time a Central Pacific hurricane was named "Nina". The name was not retired, but because of the use of a current naming list using the Hawaiian language, the name "Nina" will likely not be used again.

== See also ==
- List of off-season Pacific hurricanes
- List of Pacific hurricanes
- Hurricane Iwa – Central Pacific hurricane that formed and took a similar track to Nina.
