= 1965–66 South-West Indian Ocean cyclone season =

Cyclone season in the Southwest Indian Ocean

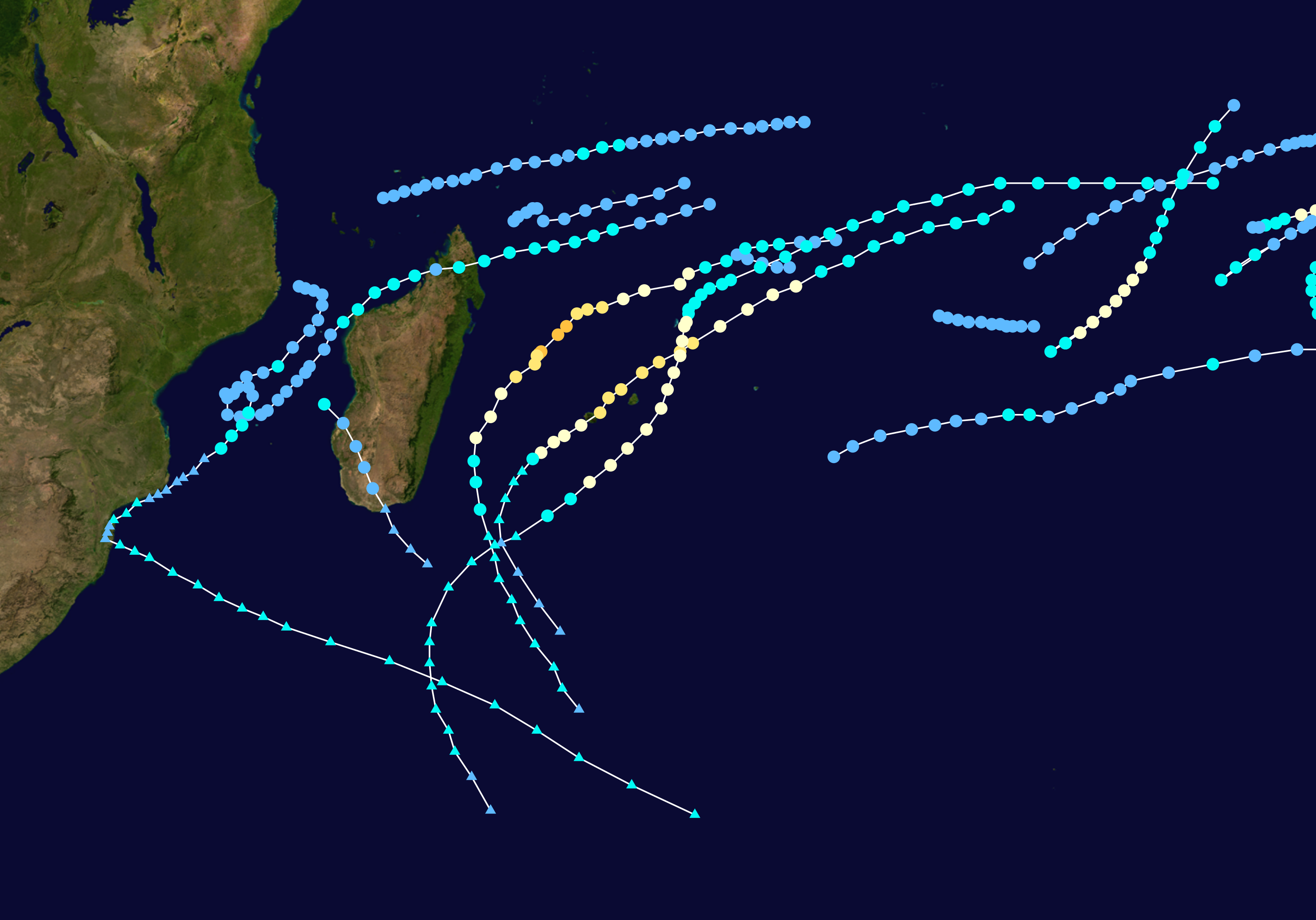
- Season summary map

Seasonal boundaries
- First system formed: August 9, 1965
- Last system dissipated: May 1, 1966

Strongest storm
- Name: Ivy
  - Maximum winds: 220 km/h (140 mph) (1-minute sustained)
  - Lowest pressure: 925 hPa (mbar)

Seasonal statistics
- Total depressions: 12
- Total storms: 4
- Tropical cyclones: 3
- Total fatalities: 3
- Total damage: Unknown

Related articles
- 1965–66 Australian region cyclone season; 1965–66 South Pacific cyclone season

The 1965–66 South-West Indian Ocean cyclone season was a near average season, despite beginning unusually early on August 9 with the formation of an early-season tropical depression, Anne and ended on May 1.

== Systems ==
=== Tropical Disturbance Anne ===
- Tropical disturbance (MFR)
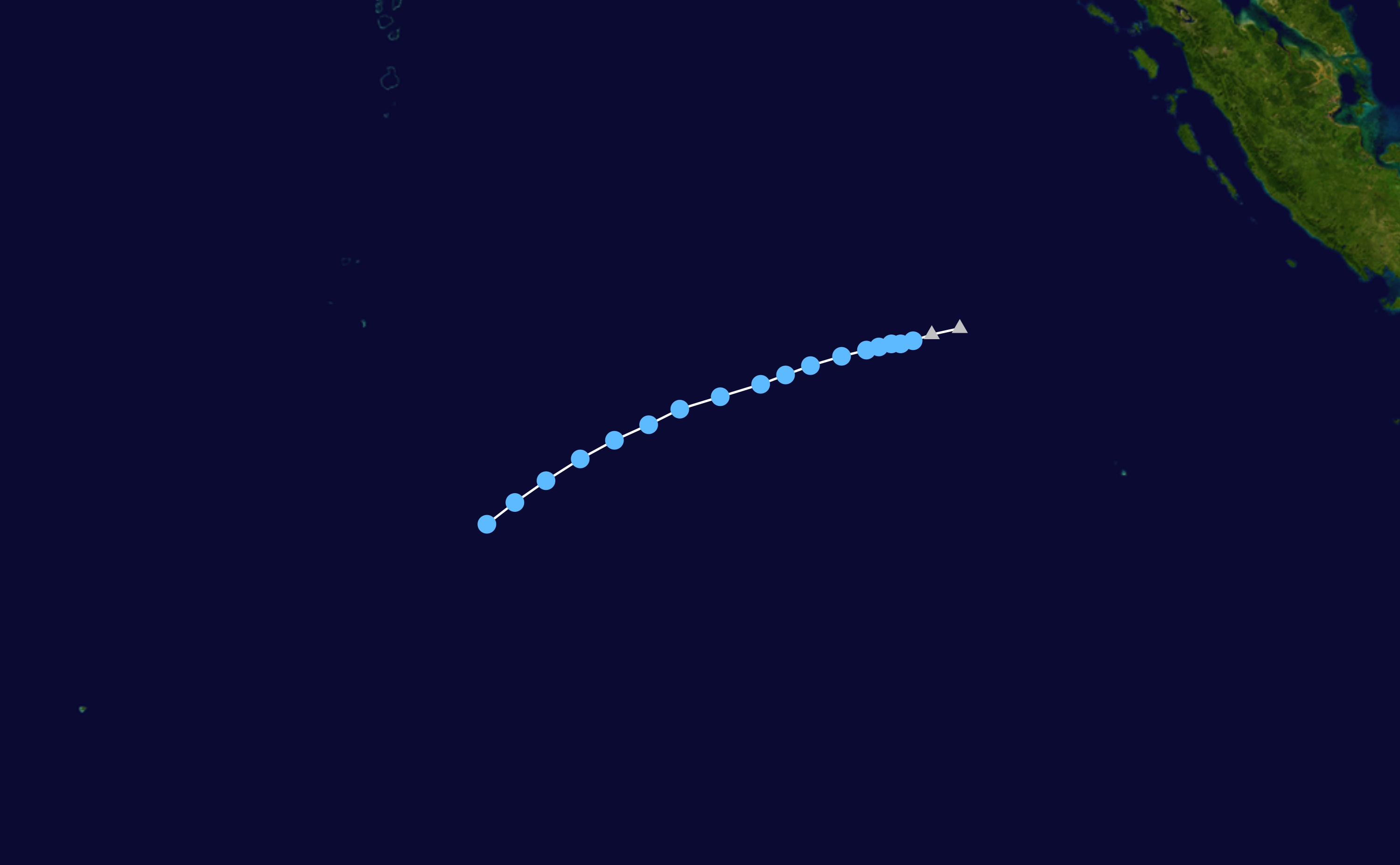
- Duration: August 15 – August 15
- Peak intensity: 35 km/h (25 mph) (10-min);

Anne existed on August 15 and didn’t last a day. Anne also had a peak at a small 25 miles per hour (35 kilometers per hour.)

=== Tropical Depression Brenda ===
- Tropical disturbance (MFR)
- Tropical depression (SSHWS)
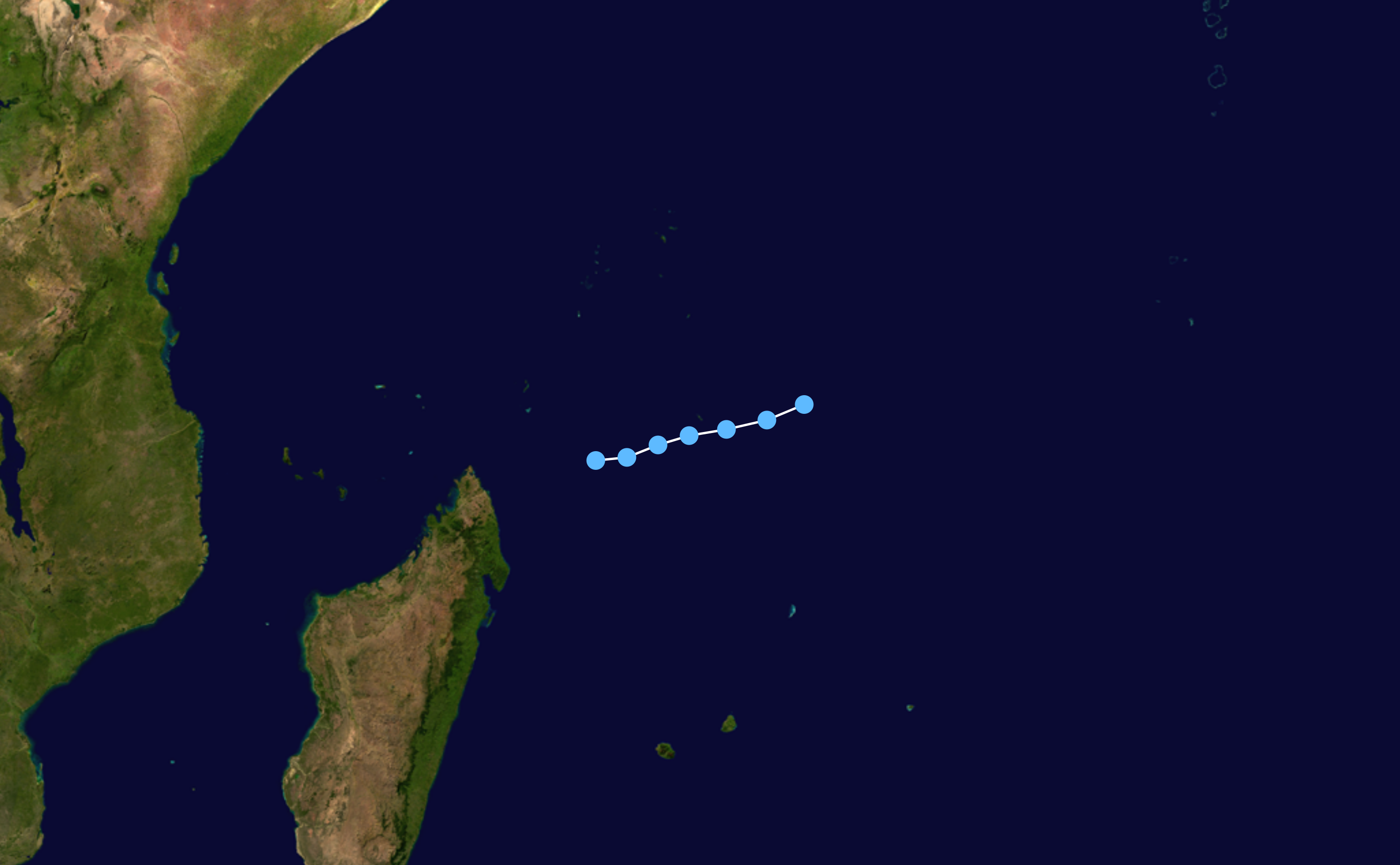
- Duration: August 16 – August 18
- Peak intensity: 45 km/h (30 mph) (10-min);

Brenda existed from August 16 to August 18. The peak was 30 miles per hour or 45 KM/H.

=== Tropical Storm Claude ===
- Severe tropical storm (MFR)
- Tropical storm (SSHWS)
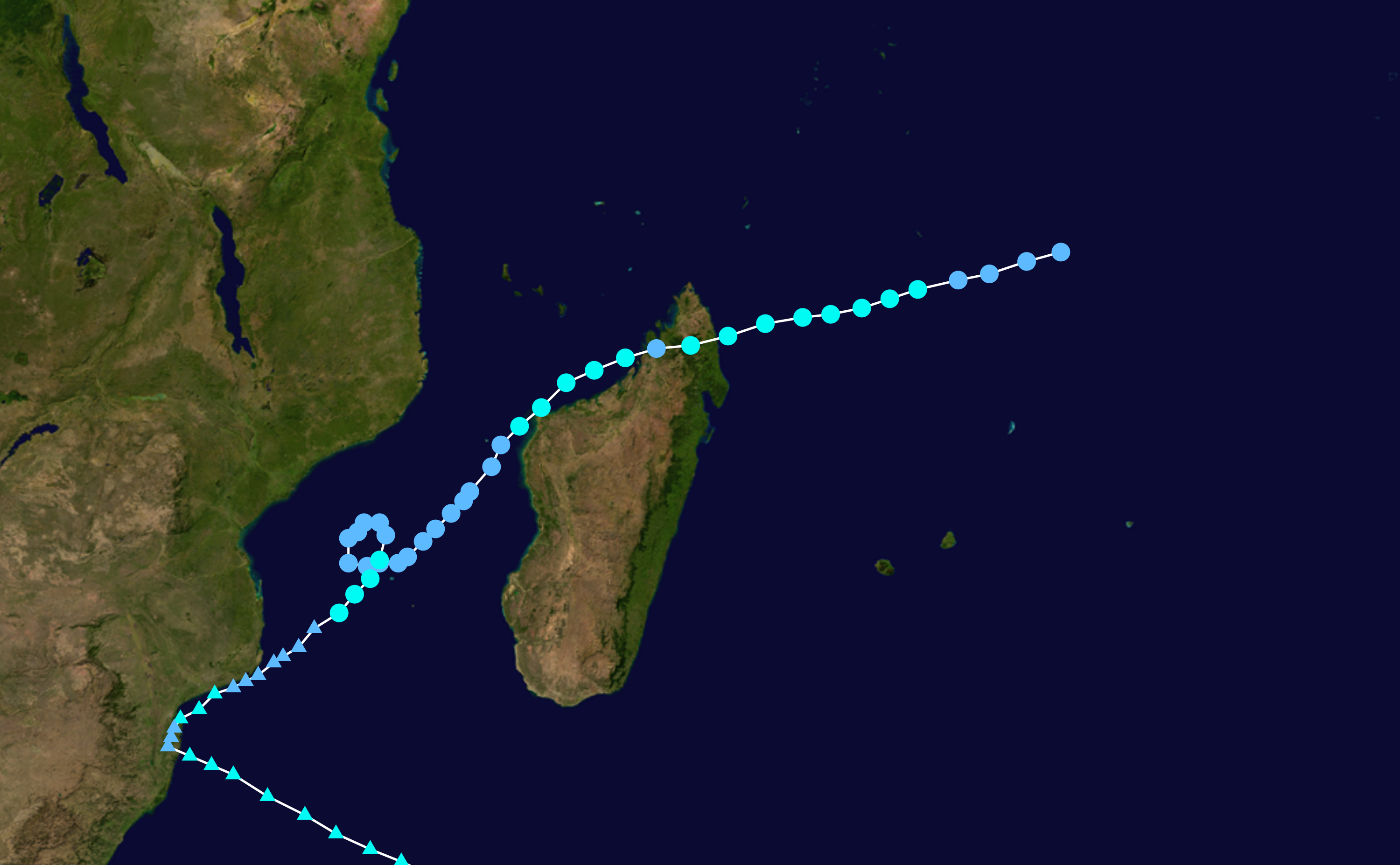
- Duration: December 24 – January 3
- Peak intensity: 95 km/h (60 mph) (10-min);

Claude existed from December 24 to January 10.

=== Tropical Cyclone Denise ===
- Tropical cyclone (MFR)
- Category 2 tropical cyclone (SSHWS)
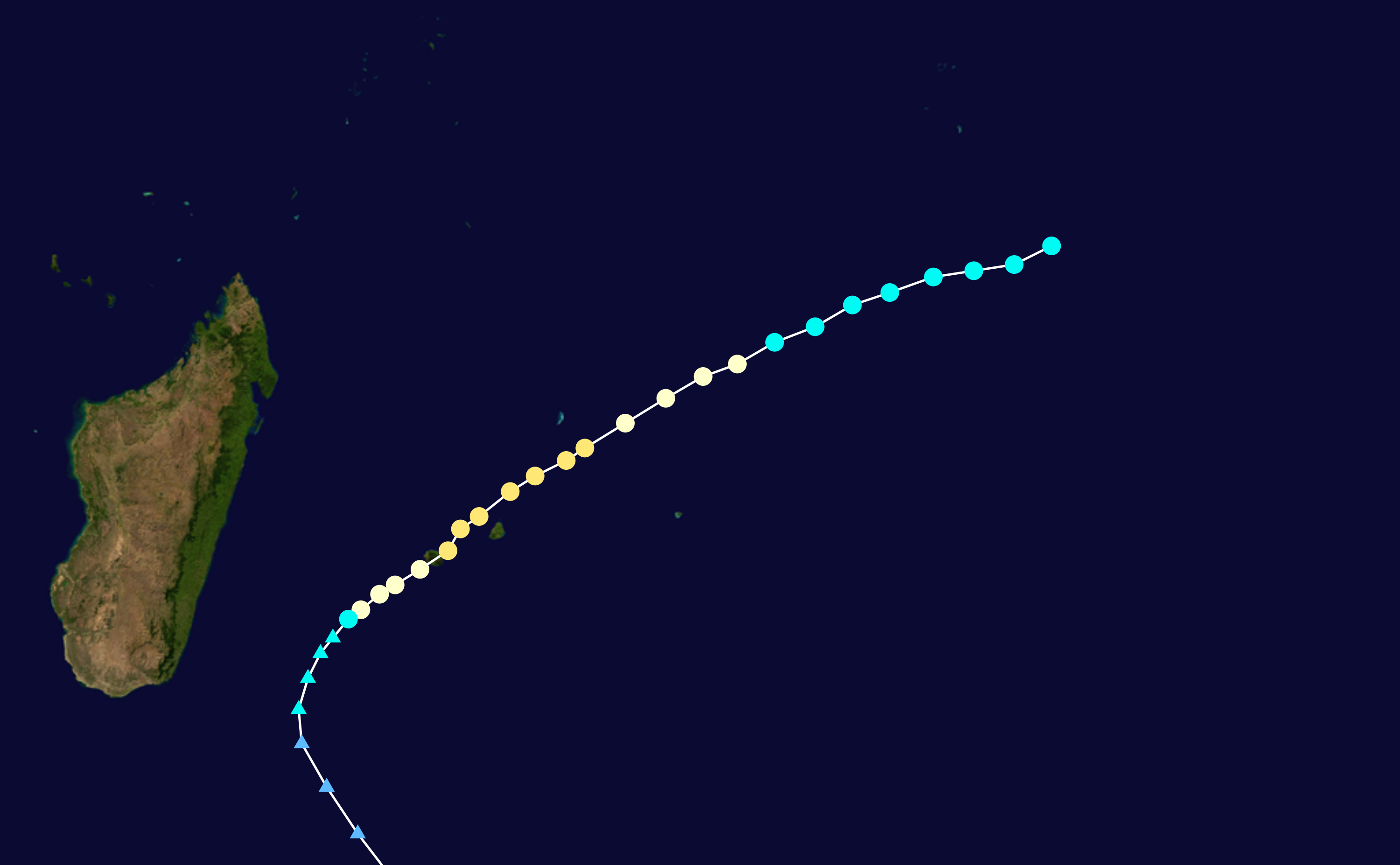
- Duration: January 2 – January 10
- Peak intensity: 150 km/h (90 mph) (10-min);

On January 7, Cyclone Denise passed north of Mauritius, producing wind gusts of 170 km/h (110 mph). Later, the storm crossed over Réunion, dropping record rainfall. Over a 24-hour period, Denise dropped 1,825 mm (71.9 in) of rainfall at Foc Foc, Réunion, of which 1,144 mm (45.0 in) fell over 12 hours; both precipitation totals are the highest recorded worldwide for their respective durations. Over 48 hours, precipitation totaled 2,230 mm (88 in) at Bras Sec. The heavy rains caused flooding that killed three people, and caused severe road and crop damage.

=== Tropical Depression Evelyn ===
- Tropical depression (MFR)
- Tropical depression (SSHWS)
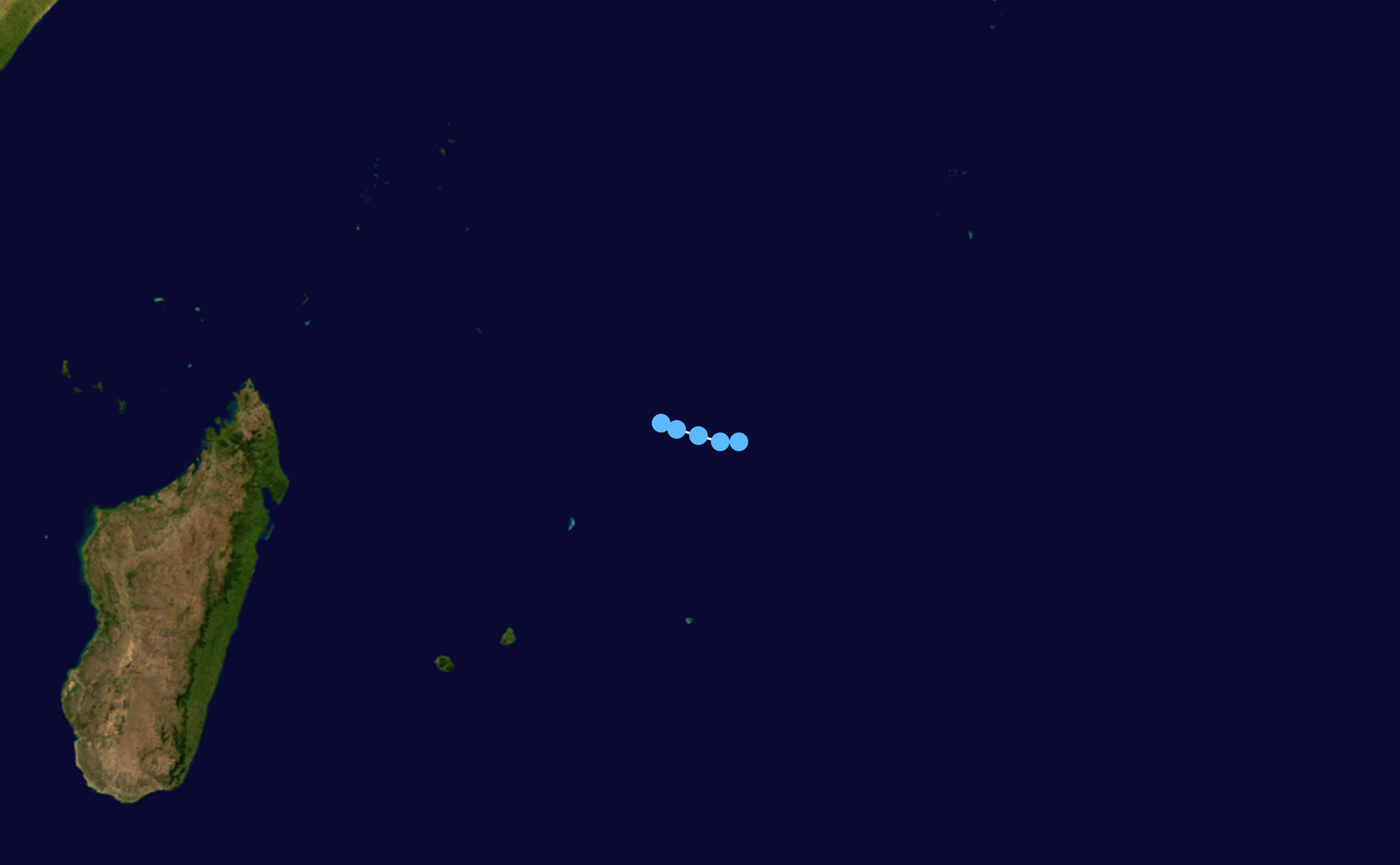
- Duration: January 19 – January 20
- Peak intensity: 55 km/h (35 mph) (10-min);

Evelyn existed from January 19 to January 20.

=== Tropical Depression Francine ===
- Tropical depression (MFR)
- Tropical depression (SSHWS)
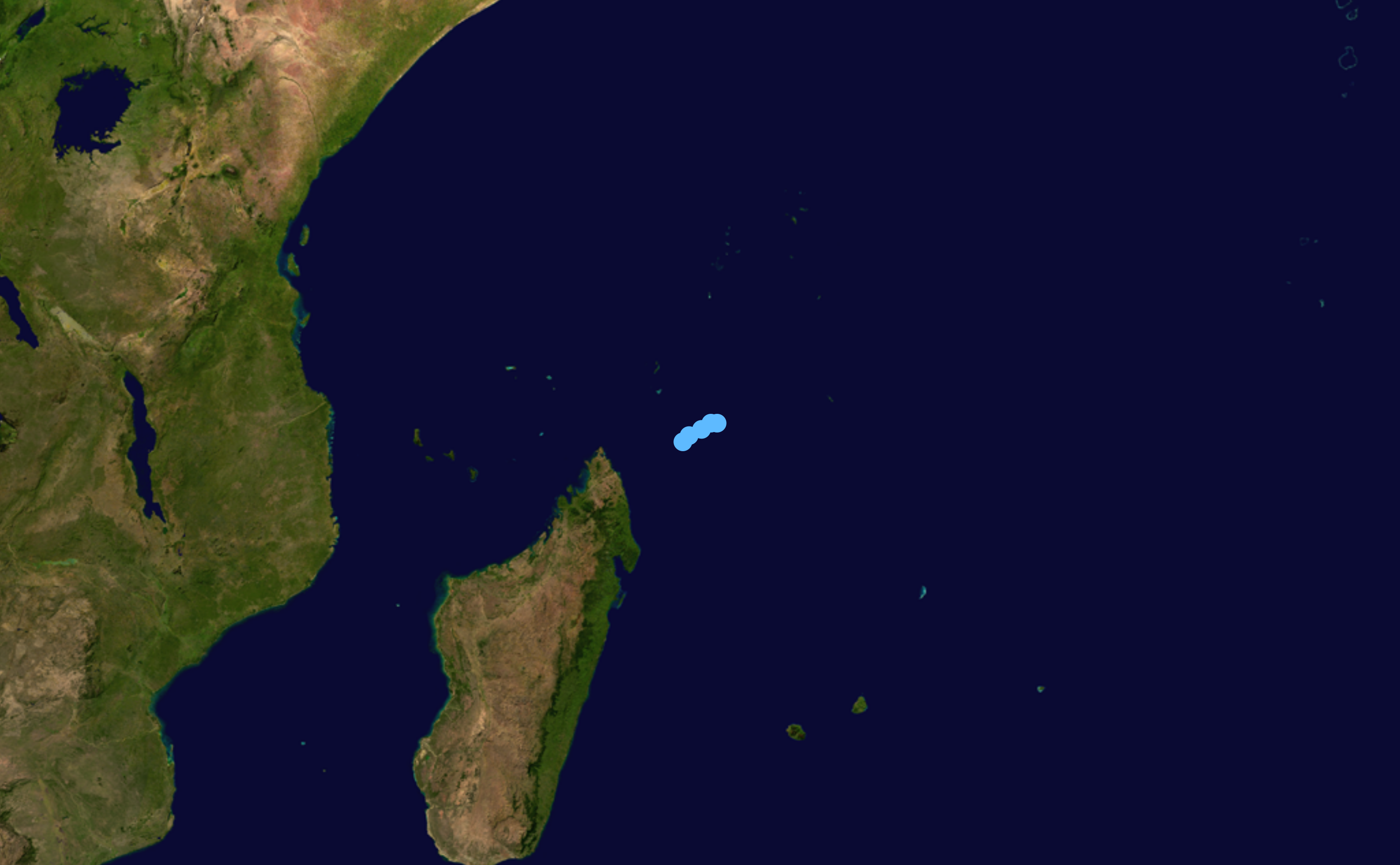
- Duration: January 30 – February 1
- Peak intensity: 55 km/h (35 mph) (10-min);

Francine existed from January 30 to February 1.

=== Tropical Storm Germaine ===
- Tropical depression (MFR)
- Tropical storm (SSHWS)
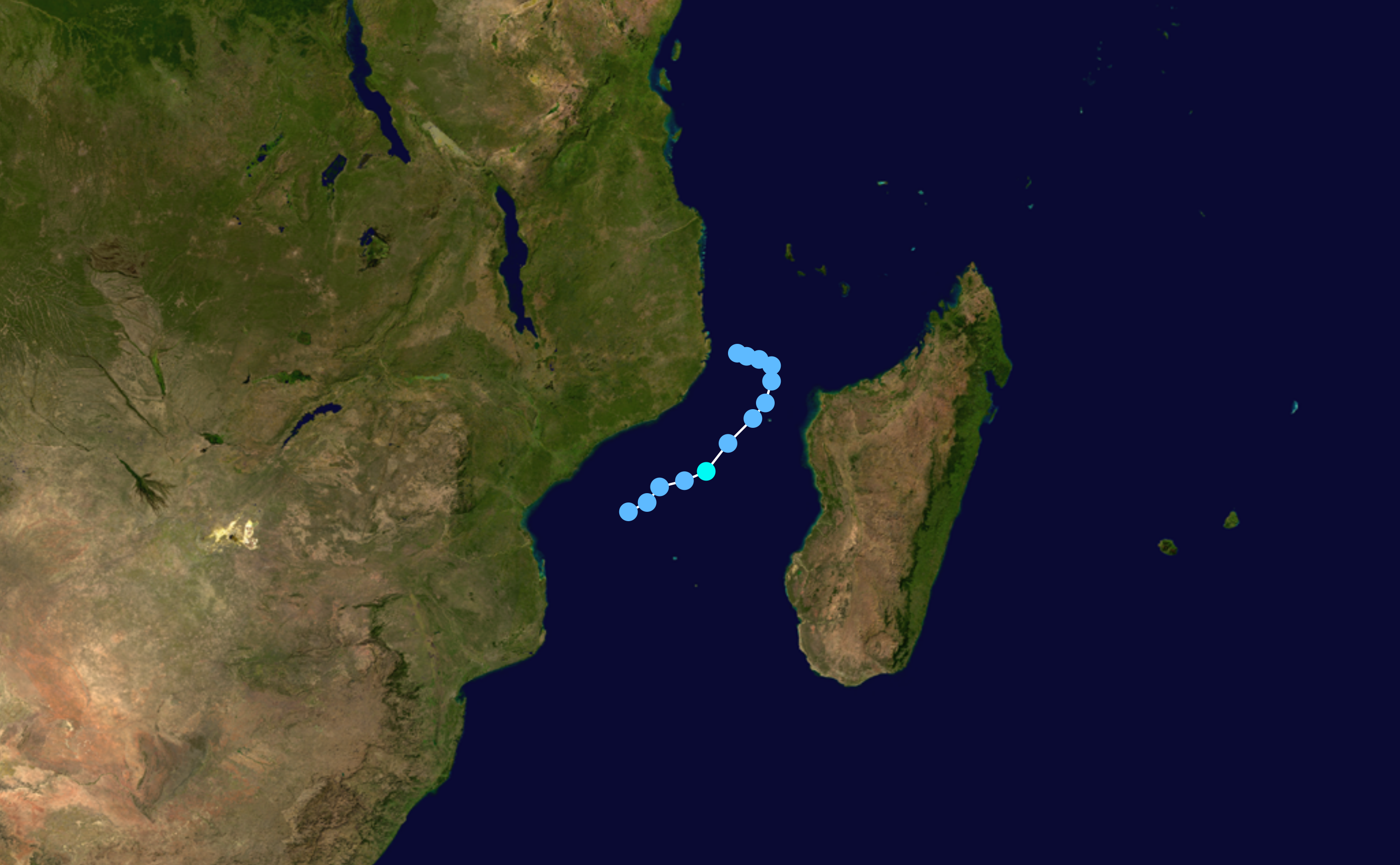
- Duration: February 14 – February 17
- Peak intensity: 55 km/h (35 mph) (10-min);

Germaine existed from February 14 to February 17.

=== Tropical Storm Hilary ===
- Tropical depression (MFR)
- Tropical storm (SSHWS)
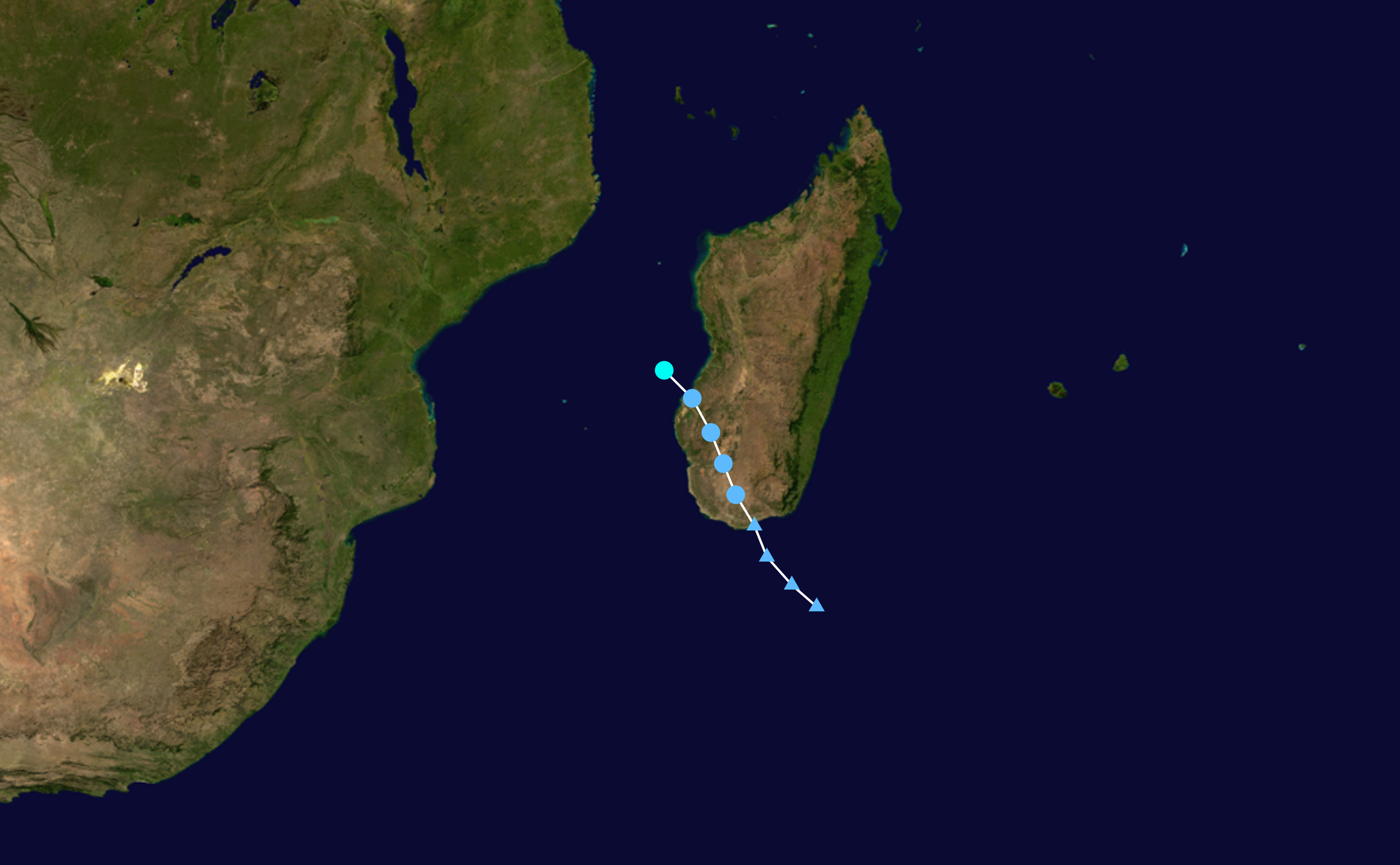
- Duration: February 20 – February 23
- Peak intensity: 55 km/h (35 mph) (10-min);

Hilary existed from February 20 to February 23.

=== Tropical Cyclone Ivy ===
- Intense tropical cyclone (MFR)
- Category 4 tropical cyclone (SSHWS)
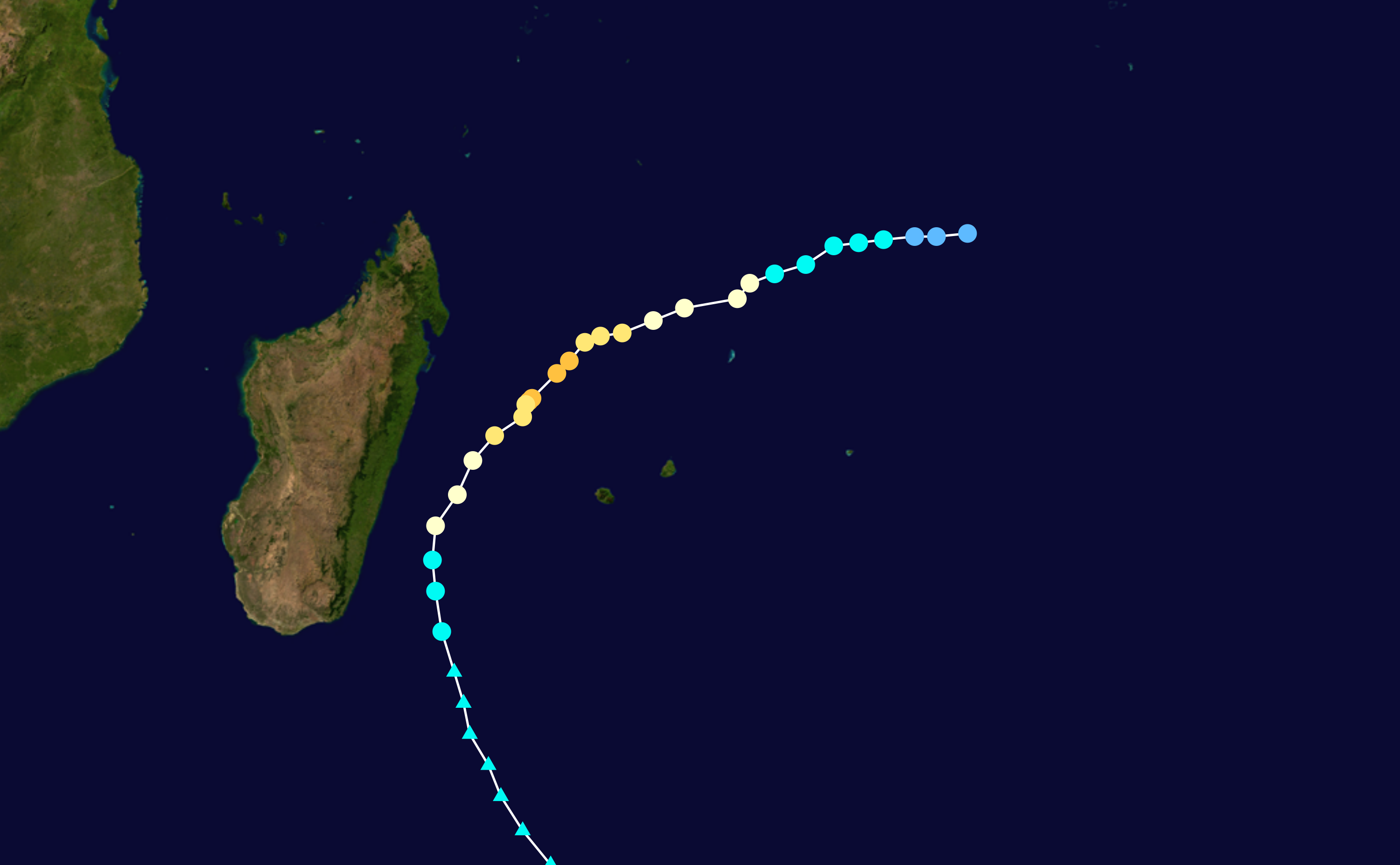
- Duration: March 3 – March 12
- Peak intensity: 195 km/h (120 mph) (10-min);

Ivy existed from March 3 to March 12.

=== Tropical Storm Martha–Judith ===
- Tropical depression (MFR)
- Tropical storm (SSHWS)
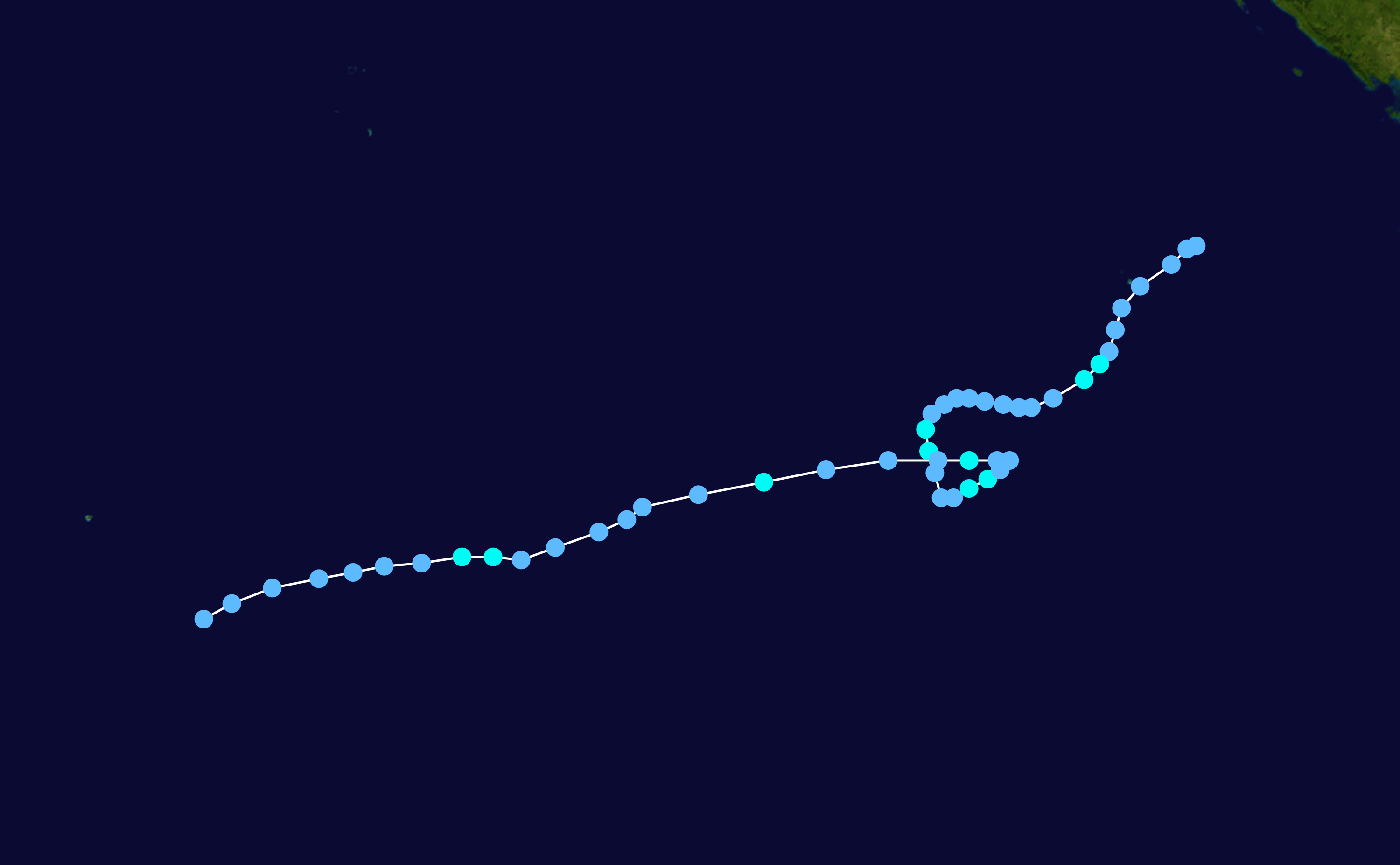
- Duration: March 3 (entered basin) – March 8
- Peak intensity: 55 km/h (35 mph) (10-min);

Judith was the tenth cyclone of the season and was formed in the Australian basin on February 23.

=== Tropical Cyclone Nancy–Kay ===
- Tropical cyclone (MFR)
- Category 1 tropical cyclone (SSHWS)
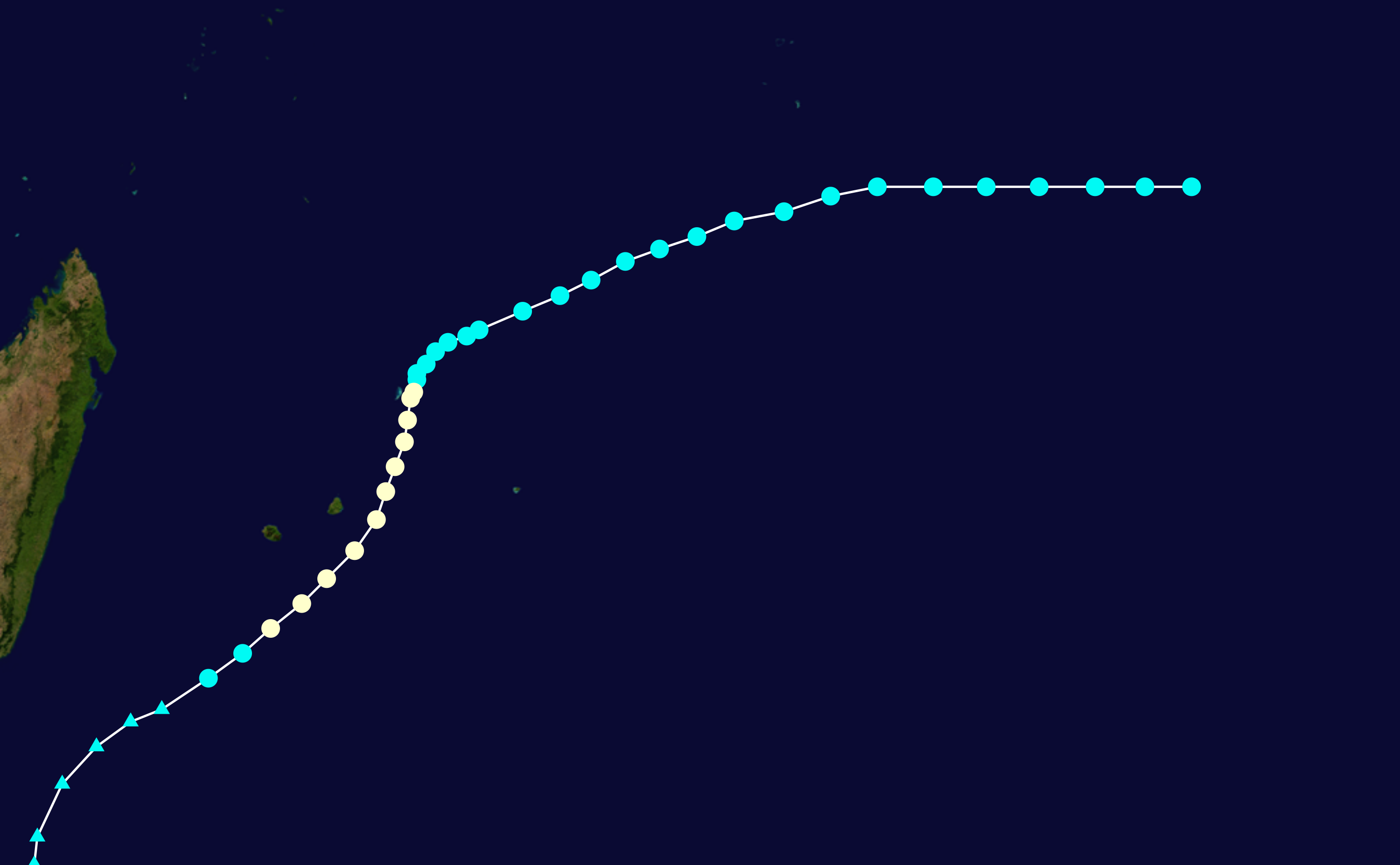
- Duration: March 17 – March 29
- Peak intensity: 150 km/h (90 mph) (10-min);

=== Tropical Depression Lily ===
- Tropical depression (MFR)
- Tropical depression (SSHWS)
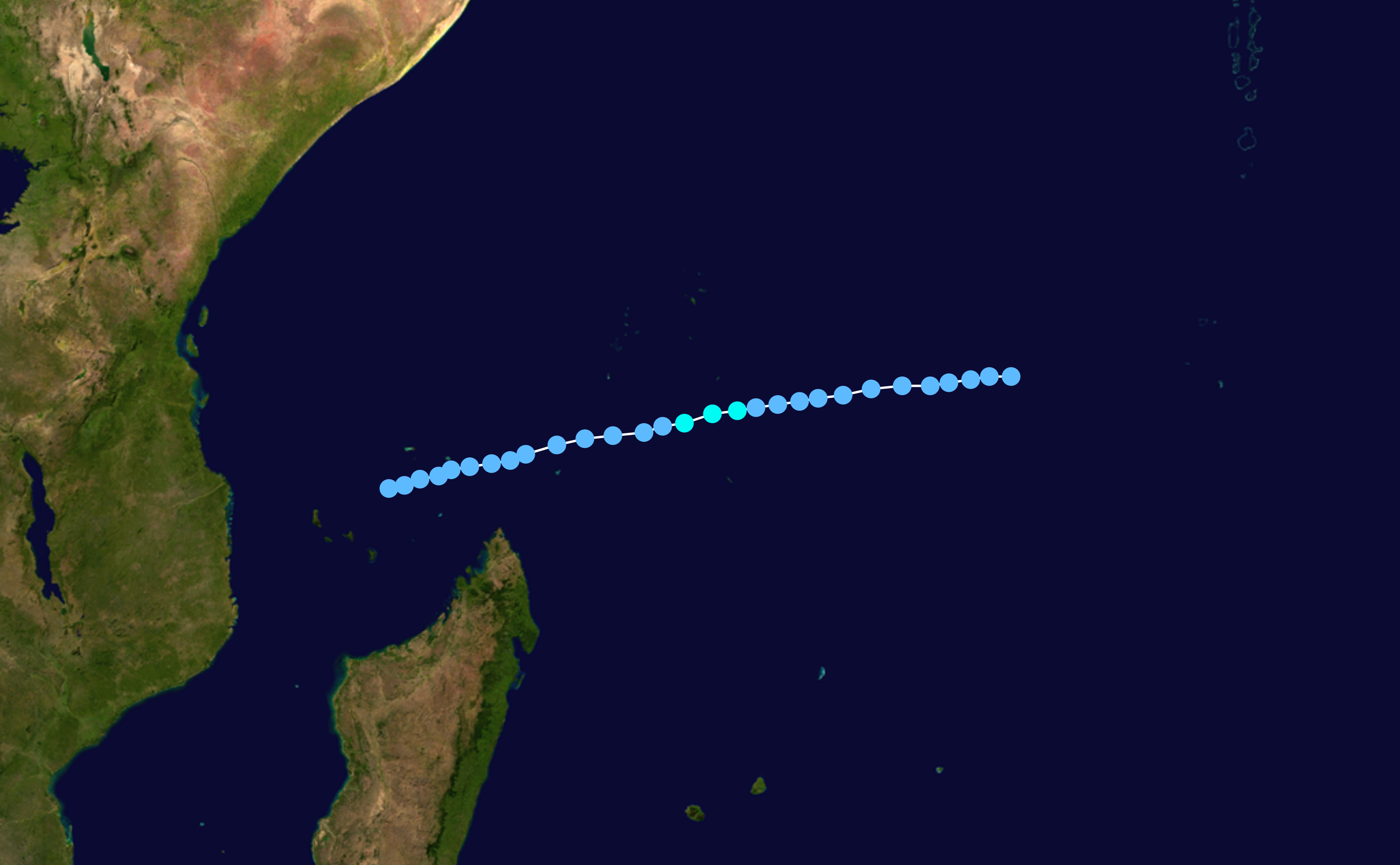
- Duration: April 22 – May 1
- Peak intensity: 55 km/h (35 mph) (10-min);

Lily existed from April 22 to May 1.

== See also ==
- Atlantic hurricane seasons: 1965, 1966
- Eastern Pacific hurricane seasons: 1965, 1966
- Western Pacific typhoon seasons: 1965, 1966
- North Indian Ocean cyclone seasons: 1965, 1966
