= Hurricane Polo =

Category 5 Pacific hurricane in 2026

- Polo at its peak intensity offshore southwestern Mexico on September 22

Meteorological history
- Formed: September 20, 2026
- Dissipated: September 30, 2026

Category 5 major hurricane
- 1-minute sustained (SSHWS/NWS)
- Highest winds: 180 mph (285 km/h)
- Lowest pressure: 892 mbar (hPa); 26.34 inHg (Second-most intense in Eastern Pacific)

Overall effects
- Fatalities: 8 total
- Missing: 1
- Damage: >$100 million (2026 USD)
- Areas affected: Western and Northwestern Mexico (particularly Jalisco, Baja California Sur, Sonora and Chihuahua), Southwestern United States
- IBTrACS
- Part of the 2026 Pacific hurricane season

Hurricane Polo was a damaging and extremely powerful tropical cyclone that became the second-most intense Pacific hurricane on record, with a central pressure of 892 mbar (26.34 inHg), behind only Hurricane Patricia. The eighteenth named storm, seventh hurricane, fifth major hurricane, and record-tying third Category 5 hurricane of the extremely active 2026 Pacific hurricane season, Polo formed on September 20 and explosively intensified into a Category 5 hurricane by September 22. Eyewall replacement cycles caused the hurricane to fluctuate between Category 4 and 5 over the next few days while moving westward, before beginning to turn northwards and recurving while steadily weakening, before making consecutive landfalls on the Baja California peninsula and mainland Mexico as a hurricane on September 29. Polo quickly weakened after moving inland and dissipated over the mountainous terrain later that day. It was also the most intense tropical cyclone worldwide in 2026 so far.

Due to the proximity of the hurricane to Mexico, watches and warnings were issued for a sizable stretch of the coastline. The ports of Acapulco, Lázaro Cárdenas, Puerto Marqués and Zihuatanejo were closed to shipping on September 21, and classes were suspended in coastal regions of the states of Guerrero and Michoacán. Polo brought hurricane-force winds and dangerous swells to the Revillagigedo Islands. At least seven people in Mexico were killed as a result of Polo, with one person still missing. Polo's remnants also interacted with an upper-level low to produce heavy rainfall and significant flash flooding over the southwestern United States. Aon plc estimated that losses were greater than US$100 million.

== Meteorological history ==
Map plotting the storm's track and intensity, according to the Saffir–Simpson scale Map key Saffir–Simpson scale Tropical depression (≤38 mph, ≤62 km/h) Tropical storm (39–73 mph, 63–118 km/h) Category 1 (74–95 mph, 119–153 km/h) Category 2 (96–110 mph, 154–177 km/h) Category 3 (111–129 mph, 178–208 km/h) Category 4 (130–156 mph, 209–251 km/h) Category 5 (≥157 mph, ≥252 km/h) Unknown Storm type Tropical cyclone Subtropical cyclone Extratropical cyclone, remnant low, tropical disturbance, or monsoon depression

During mid-September 2026, an area of low pressure formed to the south of Mexico. The disturbance then gradually organized in the following days, being designated as Invest 99E on September 17. By September 19, the NHC increased formation chances to 90%. On September 20 at 21:00 UTC, amid an increase in its organized convective banding and a defined circulation becoming evident, the area of low pressure was upgraded to a tropical depression, gaining the designation Tropical Depression Seventeen-E. The following day, the NHC upgraded the depression to a tropical storm, at which time it was assigned the name Polo. Amid a favorable environment for intensification, with 31 °C (88 °F) waters off the coast of Mexico, only limited wind shear observed, and a tropical cyclone intensity forecast technique showing "at least a 99th percentile event for intensification", Polo began to enter a period of significant rapid intensification. Shortly thereafter, at 18:00 UTC on September 21, the NHC upgraded Polo to a hurricane based on data collected by Hurricane Hunters.

Most intense Pacific hurricanes
| Rank | Hurricane | Season | Pressure | |
| Rank | Hurricane | Season | hPa | inHg |
|---|---|---|---|---|
| 1 | Patricia | 2015 | 872 | 25.75 |
| 2 | Polo | 2026 | 892 | 26.34 |
| 3 | Linda | 1997 | 902 | 26.64 |
| 4 | Rick | 2009 | 906 | 26.76 |
| 5 | Kenna | 2002 | 913 | 26.96 |
| 6 | Ava | 1973 | 915 | 27.02 |
| 6 | Ioke | 2006 | 915 | 27.02 |
| 8 | Marie | 2014 | 918 | 27.11 |
| 8 | Odile | 2014 | 918 | 27.11 |
| 10 | Guillermo | 1997 | 919 | 27.14 |
Listing is only for tropical cyclones in the Pacific Ocean north of the equator and east of the International Dateline

Intensification was briefly slowed by an eyewall replacement cycle, which completed before the storm strengthened into a strong Category 2 hurricane at 3:00 UTC on September 22. Explosive intensification then resumed, and Polo became the season's third Category 5 hurricane by 12:00 UTC by the following day, tying a 1994 record. Polo's winds increased by 110 mph (175 km/h) in a 24-hour period, one of the fastest rapid intensifications on record. Only a few hours after reaching Category 5 strength, Polo was revealed by Hurricane Hunters to have a pressure of 892 mbar (26.34 inHg) and winds of 180 mph (285 km/h), making Polo the second-most intense Pacific hurricane by central pressure (after only Hurricane Patricia) and tied with Hurricane Rick as the third-strongest by maximum sustained winds, after Patricia and Linda. It is also tied with the 1935 Labor Day hurricane and Hurricane Melissa for the fourth-most intense hurricane in the Western Hemisphere by central pressure.

After peak intensity, Polo began to weaken in response to another eyewall replacement cycle. It weakened below Category 5 intensity by 9:00 UTC on September 23, with its winds decreasing to 145 mph (230 km/h) by 18:00 UTC. However, the completion of the eyewall replacement cycle allowed it to restrengthen, and it regained Category 5 intensity by 00:40 UTC the following day, with maximum winds of 160 mph (260 km/h) and a pressure of 923 mbar (27.26 inHg), becoming one of only four Pacific hurricanes to reach Category 5 intensity more than once, only three weeks after Hurricane Lowell achieved the same feat. Another eyewall replacement cycle caused Polo to again weaken to Category 4 intensity a few hours later. Once again, Polo completed the eyewall replacement cycle and became a Category 5 hurricane for the third time on September 25, becoming the first Pacific hurricane to reach Category 5 strength three times. This time, Polo significantly strengthened and regained winds of 180 mph (285 km/h) and a pressure of 900 mbar (26.58 inHg) only a few hours later. Increasing wind shear caused it to weaken below Category 5 intensity by 15:00 UTC September 26. Recurving to the northeast, Polo continued weakening and made landfall near Las Barrancas, in the municipality of Comondú, Baja California Sur, as a Category 2 hurricane at 6:00 UTC September 29. Polo weakened to Category 1 status as a result of its passage over the Baja California Peninsula, crossed the Gulf of California, and made landfall again in mainland Mexico near Guaymas, Sonora, as a minimal hurricane. Land interaction caused Polo to degenerate into a trough that night.

=== Effect of climate change ===
According to a report by Climate Central, the rapid intensification of Polo was influenced by abnormally warm Pacific sea-surface temperatures, reaching 31 °C (88 °F), conditions which were made 100 to 200 times more likely due to human-caused climate change. It resulted in a sea-surface temperature 1.5 °C (2.7 °F) warmer than it would have been naturally. Natural cycles such as El Niño played a role as well.

== Preparations ==
=== Mexico ===
==== Southwest ====
On September 21, a tropical storm watch was issued for the Mexican Pacific coast from Tecpan de Galeana in Guerrero, to Manzanillo, Colima. The following day, it was upgraded to a tropical storm warning for the stretch from Tecpan de Galeana to Punta San Telmo in Michoacán, and the watch was extended west to Playa Perula in Jalisco. A yellow alert was also issued for Acapulco. Red flags were flown on Acapulco's beaches.

CONAGUA readied 21 emergency care centers, 717 brigade units, and 865 teams for disaster management. Around 2,000 electrical workers were deployed by the federal government of Mexico. Temporary shelters with capacity for 200 people opened in Zihuatanejo. There were 64 shelters in Acapulco, Costa Grande, and Costa Chica. Jalisco opened 38 shelters. Shelters were also opened in Colima. In Southwestern Mexico, the ports of Acapulco and Zihuatanejo closed to all vessels while the ports of Lázaro Cárdenas, Manzanillo, Puerto Escondido, and Puerto Marqués closed to small vessels. Some beaches in Colima were closed, as well. Classes were suspended in coastal regions of the states of Guerrero and Michoacán. For September 23, virtual classes were held in Guerrero. The University of Guadalajara suspended classes. Public transportation in coastal Michoacán was cancelled. Plan DN-III-E was activated. The unit undertook some preventative evacuations.

==== Northwest ====
Tropical cyclone watches and warnings, including hurricane warnings, were issued for much of the coast of the Baja California peninsula and Sonora. Yellow alerts were issued in southern Sonora while the rest of the state was on a blue alert.

In Baja California Sur, the port of Cabo San Lucas and Los Cabos closed. La Paz's port ordered its evacuation. Thousands of units of the Mexican military were deployed in the state, including Plan DN-III-E, the fourth zone of the Pacific Naval Force, the Mexican National Guard, and Plan Marina. Some shelters opened across the peninsula. La Paz restricted the crossing of streams within the city. Cultural landmarks, including museums and parks, closed. Beaches across the state had restricted access, including in Los Cabos. As of September 23, 2026, seventeen flights have been delayed at Los Cabos International Airport as a result of Polo. Baja California opened shelters for five of its municipalities.

In Sonora, classes were suspended in dozens of municipalities. Bahía de Kino used a high school as a shelter. All non-essential activities in fourteen of those municipalities were halted. Six flights at Hermosillo International Airport in Sonora were cancelled as a result of Polo.

=== United States ===
In an effort to prevent similar damage to what Hurricane Marie caused, some walls to break waves were constructed in Long Beach, California.

As Polo approached the United States, flash flood watches were triggered in portions of Arizona on Septemeber 29. Flood watches extended as far as Iowa. Nevada Task Force One was deployed to New Mexico in advance of the hurricane as well. On September 29, a flash flood emergency was issued for Doña Ana County, New Mexico, due to imminent dam failure as Polo approached. The risk of severe thunderstorms in the Dallas–Fort Worth metroplex caused the cancellation of a homecoming parade in Fairview. The city government of Fort Worth opened two sandbagging sites on September 30 to give away 750 sandbags.

== Impact ==
Polo after reaching Category 5 intensity for the third time, on the morning of September 25

=== Mexico ===
==== Southwest ====
A few days prior to Polo's formation, several communities in Guerrero experienced severe flooding from the system's precursor, including Zihuatanejo. In Zihuatanejo, heavy rainfall from Polo caused flooding and property damage. At least five vehicles were flooded, and several homes were damaged. Rain from the hurricane also caused a car accident in Coyuca de Benítez. Minor flooding was also reported in Nueva Belén and Tabachines. Two trees fell in Acapulco, causing minor damage. In the seas around Acapulco, wave heights of between seven and eight metres (23 and 26 ft) were recorded. Polo also caused rough seas off Playa Azul, which impacted several buildings; at least nine homes received damage. In Lázaro Cárdenas, waves caused property damage as well, including destroying a hotel pool. Arroyo Zapotlanejo in Jalisco overflowed, damaging dozens of homes. Jalisco State Highway 555 was damaged by landslides. Colima and other parts of western Mexico had some rain and rough seas. In Nayarit, fourteen homes were flooded by storm surge.

Four people died after a home was swept away by floods in Talpa de Allende. A woman went missing in Puerto Vallarta after getting pulled out to sea.

==== Baja California Peninsula ====
Over a dozen people became trapped in San Blas as a result of river flooding. Waves from Polo surpassed barriers built to prevent the infiltration of water onto land. Part of those walls collapsed in Puerto San Carlos. The cost to replace these walls was expected to cost MX$100 million (US$5.5 million). Mexican Federal Highway 1 was damaged at several points as a result of Polo. Landslides blocking roads were reported across northern Baja California Sur in Comondú, Loreto, and Mulegé. In Comondú, more than 80 homes were damaged and at least eleven homes were destroyed. Blackouts were experienced by 20,000 customers in the state.

==== Sonora ====
Downed trees and poles, as well as street flooding, were reported across Guaymas following the passage of Polo. One house collapsed as a result of the storm. Storm surge also inundated roads in Guaymas. An electric transformer fell onto a residence in Empalme. 140 residents were evacuated from flooded areas. Eight vehicles were stranded and eleven fallen utility poles were reported. A road between the towns of Rosario de Tesopaco and Yécora was closed due to the overflow of El Sapuchio Stream. Another road between Suaqui Grande and Tecoripa was closed due to flooding. 1,128 people were displaced statewide. At least nine communities were left isolated. Four bridges and more than 8,152 homes and 400 km of roads were damaged. A 66-year-old man drowned after being swept away by an overflowing river.

The wind history of Hurricane Polo.

==== Chihuahua ====
As Polo moved inland, it combined with the Mexican monsoon to produce heavy rainfall in the state of Chihuahua. Rainfall rates of 20 mm (0.79 in) were observed within 40 minutes in Chihuahua City, where the storm damaged fences, light poles, and trees. About 50 vehicles stalled in excessive rainfall. Three people were killed due to the storm in Chihuahua: two in Ciudad Juárez and one in Parral. As a result of the storm, a yellow alert was issued for the Northwest and Sierra Taramuhara districts of Chihuahua.

=== United States ===
==== Arizona ====
A combination of moisture from the remnants of both Polo and Hurricane Odalys, as well as a third low pressure system centered in Nevada, produced heavy rainfall across Arizona between September 28–29. Phoenix, Arizona, recorded 0.47 in (12 mm) on September 29, the wettest day in the city in nearly a year, pushing the monsoon rainfall to an above-average precipitation total. Several flights were delayed at Phoenix Sky Harbor International Airport due to severe thunderstorms. Flooding resulted in two water rescues in the city, and several others throughout Arizona. Over 1,200 customers lost power across the Phoenix metropolitan area. Several Arizona weather recording stations reported more than 4 in (100 mm) of rainfall, with one station recording more than 5 in (130 mm) of rainfall during the Hurricane Polo remnant impacts in Arizona according to National Weather Service monitoring stations. At least one Arizona river reached action or minor flooding stage. The Little Colorado River at Holbrook, Arizona reached minor flooding stage with a maximum crest at 16.28 feet (4.96 m) and 21.41 feet (6.53 m) at Woodruff, Arizona on September 30, 2026 according to USGS monitoring gauges. The Salt River (Arizona) near Roosevelt, Arizona reached a peak crest of 17.57 feet (5.36 m) and a peak discharge of 14,300 cubic feet per second on September 30, 2026 according to USGS monitoring gauges.

==== Utah and Colorado ====
The storms triggered by Polo helped the National Weather Service in Salt Lake City break its record for the most flash flood warnings in a single year since records began in 1986. The east fork of the Virgin River reached a record crest of 13.56 ft (4.13 m). A shipping container fell in the river at Zion National Park and was swept downstream by chocolate-colored floodwaters. Three people had to be rescued by helicopter from Heaps Canyon. Flooding was reported across the St. George region and at Sand Hollow State Park. Heavy rainfall extended into southwestern Colorado with the highest totals falling in and around the Sangre de Cristo and Wet Mountains. Flooding was also reported in the village of Beulah, which had been recently affected by the Aspen Acres Fire.

==== South-Central United States ====
In New Mexico, the remnants of Polo combined with moisture from Odalys caused damaging flash floods across the state just days following previous heavy rainfall. Several roads were closed due to flooding across Santa Fe County. Albuquerque recorded 1.18 in (30 mm) of rain from Polo, pushing September to be the wettest on record for the city. Santa Fe recorded the highest rainfall totals in the state, at 4.55 in (116 mm). Chaco Culture National Historical Park was closed after a major road collapse on County Route 7900. Around 1–1.5 in (25–38 mm) of rain fell in the El Paso metropolitan area. A total of 18,000 customers lost power after a severe thunderstorm downed several power lines in Vinton. A tornado was observed near Amarillo, Texas. The Amarillo Fire Department received five high water rescue calls. Another tornado touched down near Claude. In Oklahoma City, a woman required rescue from a flooded vehicle. Two counties in northeast Kansas were put under a flash flood warning after 1–2 in (25–51 mm) had already fallen and more expected on October 1. Polo combined with the merger of a frontal system led to very heavy rainfall totals throughout the state, peaking at 6.55 in (166 mm) in Salina. The storm also caused heavy rain in the Corn Belt, resulting in a slower harvest for many farmers.

== See also ==
- Weather of 2026
- Tropical cyclones in 2026
- List of Category 5 Pacific hurricanes
