= List of Category 5 Pacific hurricanes =

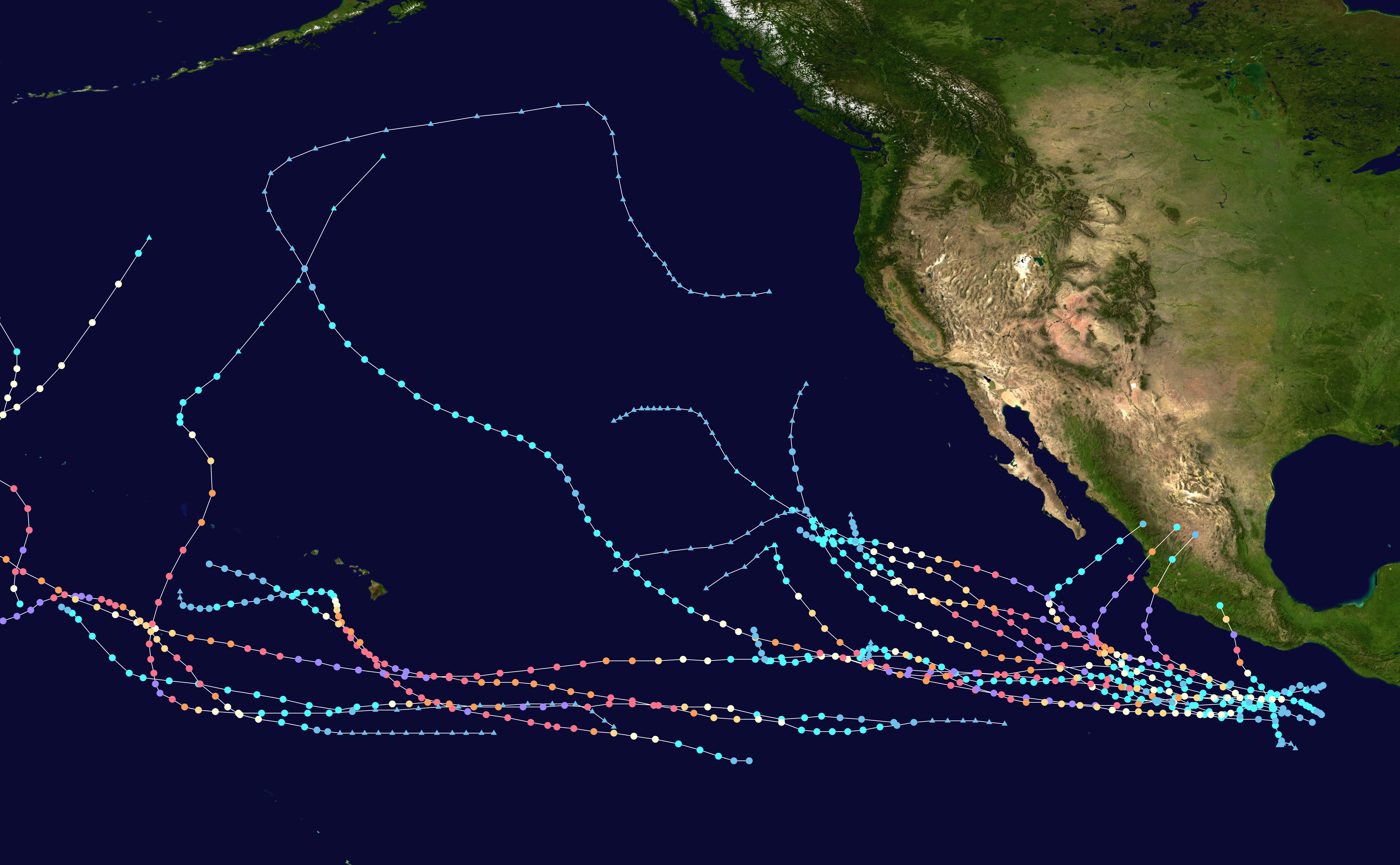
Tracks of all Category 5 northern Pacific hurricanes east of the International Date Line between 1959 and 2024.

A Category 5 Pacific hurricane is a tropical cyclone in the Pacific Ocean that reaches Category 5 intensity on the Saffir–Simpson hurricane scale, the highest possible classification on the scale. Hurricanes of this intensity are infrequent in the northeastern Pacific Ocean; only 24 have formed since 1959, and they generally develop in clusters during the same year. Landfalls by such storms are rare due to the generally westward path of tropical cyclones in the Northern Hemisphere. The term "hurricane" is used for tropical cyclones in the Pacific Ocean, north of the equator and east of the International Date Line. A Category 5 Pacific hurricane is therefore a tropical cyclone in the north Pacific Ocean that reached Category 5 intensity east of the International Date Line. Identical phenomena in the north Pacific Ocean west of the dateline are called typhoons or super typhoons. Category 5 super typhoons generally happen several times per season, so cyclones of that intensity are not exceptional for that region. This difference in terminology therefore excludes storms such as Typhoon Paka and Typhoon Oliwa of 1997, and Typhoon Genevieve of 2014, which formed east of the dateline but did not reach Category 5 intensity until after crossing the dateline.

== Climatology and statistics ==
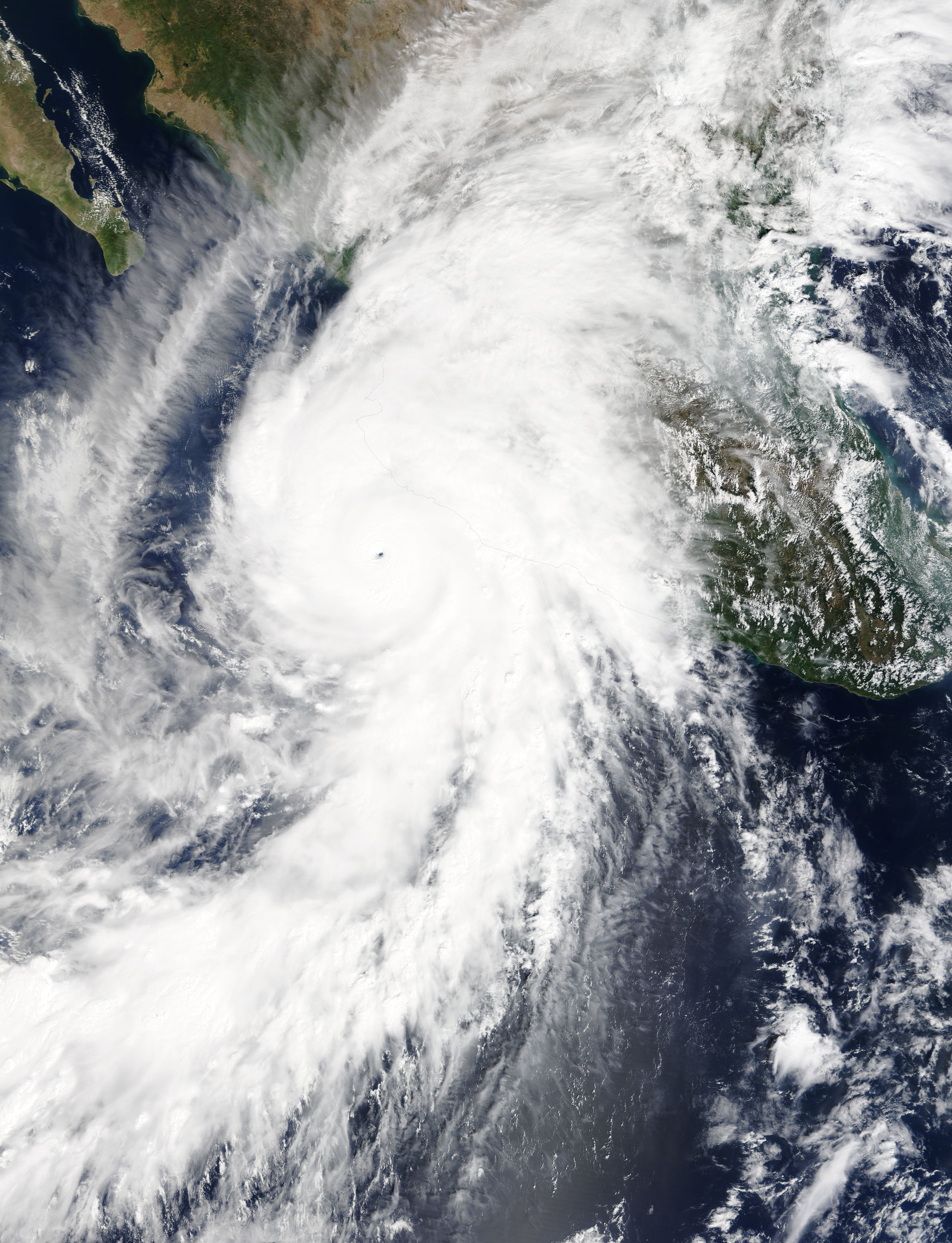
Hurricane Patricia shortly after its record peak intensity on October 23, 2015.

The majority of tropical cyclones form and organize in areas of warm sea surface temperatures, usually of at least 26.5 °C (79.7 °F) and low vertical wind shear; however, there are outliers to this general rule, such as storms that manage to intensify despite high amounts of vertical wind shear. When a pre-existing tropical disturbance – usually a tropical wave or a disturbance originating in the Intertropical Convergence Zone – enters an area where the aforementioned conditions are present, the disturbance can develop into a tropical cyclone, provided it is far enough from the equator to experience a sufficiently strong Coriolis force, which causes the counterclockwise rotation of hurricanes in the Northern Hemisphere.

Between the months of December and April, sea surface temperatures in the tropics, where most Northeast Pacific tropical cyclones develop, are usually too low to support significant development. Also, the presence of a semi-permanent high-pressure area known as the North Pacific High in the eastern Pacific greatly reduces tropical cyclone development in the winter months, as the North Pacific High results in vertical wind shear that causes environmental conditions to be unconducive to tropical cyclone formation. Another factor preventing tropical cyclones from forming during the winter is the presence of a semi-permanent low-pressure area called the Aleutian Low between January and April. Its effects in the central Pacific near the 160th meridian west cause tropical waves that form in the area to move northward into the Gulf of Alaska. As the disturbances travel northward, they dissipate or transition into an extratropical cyclone. The Aleutian Low's retreat in late-April allows the warmth of the Pacific High to meander in, bringing its powerful clockwise wind circulation with it. During the month of May, the Intertropical Convergence Zone migrates southward while vertical shear over the tropics decreases. As a result, the earliest tropical waves begin to form, coinciding with the start of the eastern Pacific hurricane season on May 15. During summer and early autumn, sea surface temperatures rise further, reaching 29 °C (84 °F) in July and August, well above the 26.5 °C (79.7 °F) threshold for the formation and intensification of tropical cyclones. This allows for tropical cyclones developing during that time to strengthen significantly, perhaps even rapidly.

The El Niño–Southern Oscillation also influences the frequency and intensity of hurricanes in the Northeast Pacific basin. During El Niño events, sea surface temperatures increase in the Northeast Pacific and vertical wind shear decreases. Because of this, an increase in tropical cyclone activity occurs; the opposite happens in the Atlantic basin during El Niño, where increased wind shear creates an unfavorable environment for tropical cyclone formation. Contrary to El Niño, La Niña events increase wind shear and decrease sea surface temperatures over the eastern Pacific, while reducing wind shear and increasing sea surface temperatures over the Atlantic.

A Category 5 hurricane is defined as having sustained windspeeds of at least 157 mph (253 km/h) over a one-minute period 10 m (32 ft 10 in) above the ground. As a tropical cyclone is moving, its wind field is asymmetric. In the northern hemisphere, the strongest winds are on the right side of the storm (relative to the direction of motion). The highest winds given in advisories are those from the right side.

Since the 1959 season, only 24 hurricanes are known to have reached Category 5 intensity. There are no known Category 5 storms occurring before 1959. It is possible that some earlier storms reached Category 5 over open waters, but they were never recognized because they never affected land and remained at sea.

== List ==
A collage of all Category 5 Pacific hurricanes between 1994 and 2026

This lists all of the Category 5 hurricanes in the order in which they formed according to the central and eastern Pacific HURDAT database, which dates back to 1949. Before the advent of reliable geostationary satellite coverage in 1966, the number of eastern Pacific tropical cyclones was significantly underestimated. It is therefore very possible that there are additional Category 5 hurricanes other than those listed, but they were not reported and therefore not recognized. However, the lack of Pacific Category 5 hurricanes during the late 1970s, 1980s, and early 1990s is considered certain.

The minimum central pressure of these storms is, for the most part, estimated from satellite imagery, typically by using the Dvorak technique to estimate maximum sustained winds and then applying a pressure–wind relationship. The reason for estimating the pressure (in lieu of direct measurements) is that most of these storms did not threaten land. In the case of Kenna, Ava, Patricia, Lane, Lowell, and Polo, the central pressure was measured by hurricane hunter aircraft flying into the storm; all of these but Ava were threatening land, and Ava was flown into by hurricane hunters to test equipment and conduct research. Because of the estimation of central pressures, it is possible that other storms more intense than those listed here have formed.

Older storms have incomplete pressure records, since there were no satellite-based estimates; the only observations were taken by ships, land-based observations, or reconnaissance aircraft when available. Ava's minimum known pressure was measured when it was a Category 4 hurricane, for example. John and Gilma have incomplete pressures because the Central Pacific Hurricane Center, in general, did not publish pressure on systems in the central Pacific (140°W to the dateline) at the time. This list is not identical to the list of most intense Pacific hurricanes; for example, 2014's Hurricane Odile, the most intense known Category 4 Pacific hurricane that did not reach Category 5, had a lowest pressure of 918 mbar (27.1 inHg), lower than that of some Category 5 hurricanes, such as Guillermo.

Hurricanes have reached Category 5 intensity during each month from June to October. The earliest to do so was 1973's Hurricane Ava, on June 7. The latest to intensify to Category 5 was 2023's Hurricane Otis on October 25. Hurricanes Ava, Gilma, Ioke, Polo, and Patricia are the most intense storms to form in their respective months. There have been no May, November, or off-season Category 5 hurricanes.

Four Pacific hurricanes are known to have reached Category 5 intensity multiple times: Emilia, Ioke, Lowell, and Polo. Polo reached Category 5 intensity three times, while the others reached it twice. Ioke also reached Category 5 status a third time, but the third instance occurred as a typhoon while in the western Pacific. Polo holds the record for longest total duration as a Category 5 hurricane, with 65 hours and 20 minutes as a Category 5 hurricane. Hurricanes Ioke, John, and Linda are tied for the second-longest-lasting Category 5 hurricane recorded, spending 42 hours at that strength, but as Ioke's and Polo's time at Category 5 intensity were in multiple distinct time intervals, John and Linda had the longest time spent consecutively at that intensity.

Hurricane Polo on 22 September 2026, at its initial peak in intensity.

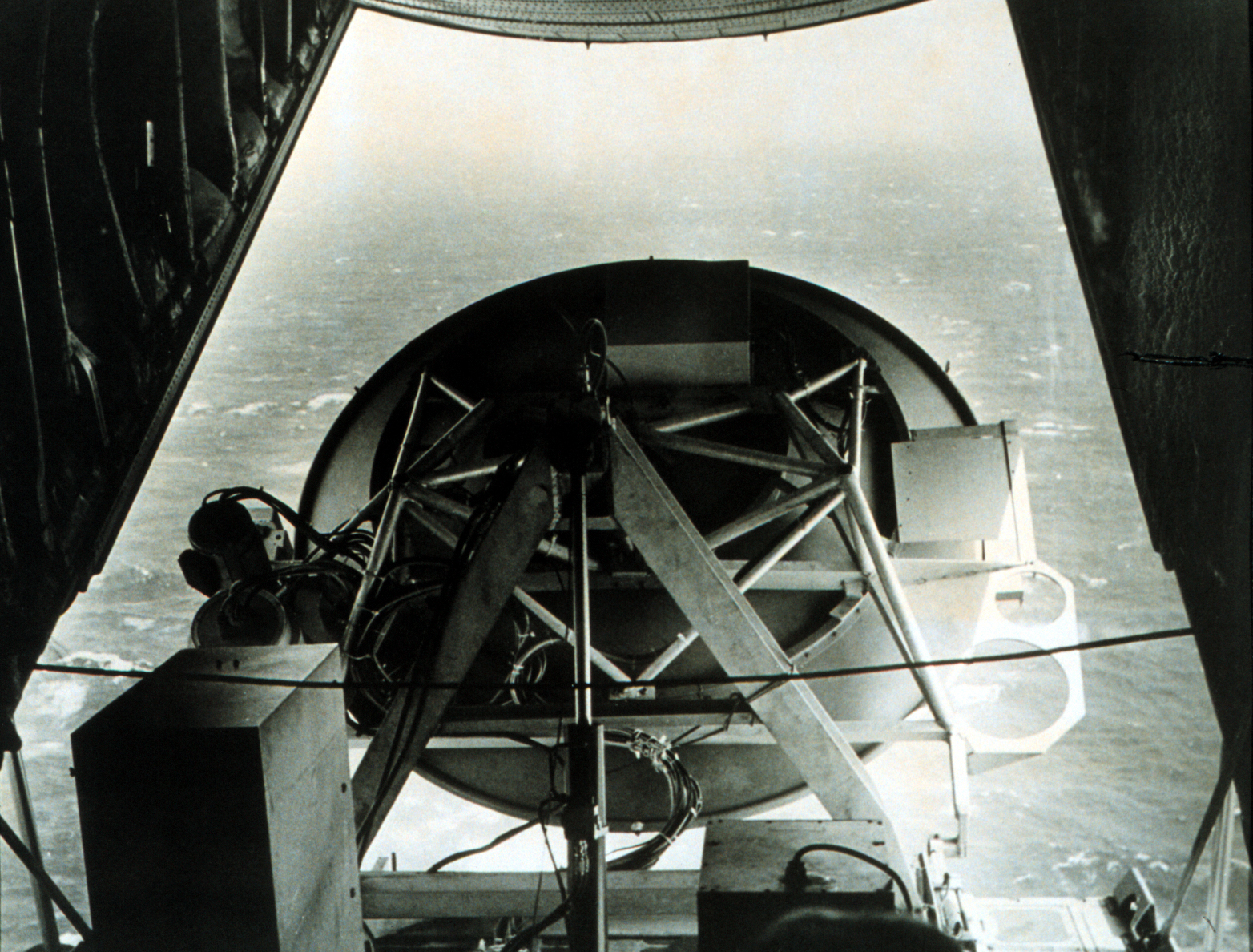
Microwave radar in the tail of a C130 during a flight into Hurricane Ava.

List of Category 5 Pacific hurricanes
Storm name	Season	Dates while at Category 5	Time at Category 5 (hours)	Peak one-minute sustained winds		Pressure	
Storm name	Season	Dates while at Category 5	Time at Category 5 (hours)	mph	km/h	hPa	inHg
Patsy	1959	September 6	6	175	280	930	27.46
Ava	1973	June 7	24	160	260	915	27.02
Emilia	1994	July 19 and 20–21	18 (Note: For its first time at Category 5, Emilia was at that intensity for 6 hours; the second time was for 12 for a total of 18 hours.)	160	260	926	27.34
Gilma	1994	July 24–25	18	160	260	920	27.17
John	1994	August 22–24	42	175	280	929	27.43
Guillermo	1997	August 4–5	24	160	260	919	27.14
Linda	1997	September 12–14	42	185	295	902	26.64
Elida	2002	July 25	6	160	260	921	27.20
Hernan	2002	September 1	12	160	260	921	27.20
Kenna	2002	October 24–25	18	165	270	913	26.96
Ioke	2006	August 25 and 26–27	42 (Note: For its first time at Category 5, Ioke was at that intensity for 18 hours; the second time was 24 additional hours east of the dateline, giving a total of 42 hours. Ioke did not lose Category 5 status on August 26, but it moved into the Western North Pacific, and thus was no longer considered a hurricane, but rather a typhoon.)	160	260	915	27.02
Rick	2009	October 18	24	180	285	906	26.75
Celia	2010	June 25	12	160	260	921	27.20
Marie	2014	August 24	6	160	260	918	27.11
Patricia	2015	October 22–23	23	215	345	872	25.75
Lane	2018	August 22	12	160	260	926	27.34
Walaka	2018	October 1–2	12	160	260	921	27.20
Willa	2018	October 22	6	160	260	925	27.32
Jova	2023	September 7	12	160	260	926	27.34
Otis	2023	October 25	9	165	270	922	27.23
Kristy	2024	October 24–25	12	160	260	926	27.34
Genevieve	2026	July 27	6	160	260	924	27.29
Lowell	2026	September 2 and 5	12 (Note: For its first time at Category 5, Lowell was at that intensity for 6 hours; the second time was also 6 hours for a total of 12 hours.)	160	260	922	27.23
Polo	2026	September 22–23, 24, and 25–26	65⅓ (Note: For its first time at Category 5, Polo was at that intensity for 21 hours; for its second time, it was at that intensity for 14 hours and 20 minutes; and for its third time, it was at that intensity for 30 hours, for a total of 65 hours and 20 minutes.)	180	285	892	26.34

== Number by month ==
Since 1959, two Category 5 hurricanes have formed in June, four in July, five in August, six in September, and seven in October. No Category 5 hurricanes have formed in May or November, nor have any developed during the off-season.

Category 5 hurricanes by month
Month	Number of hurricanes
May	0
June	2
July	4
August	5
September	6
October	7
November	0

Category 5 hurricanes by decade
Decade	Number of hurricanes
Pre-1990s	2
1990s	5
2000s	5
2010s	6
2020s	6

== Landfalls ==
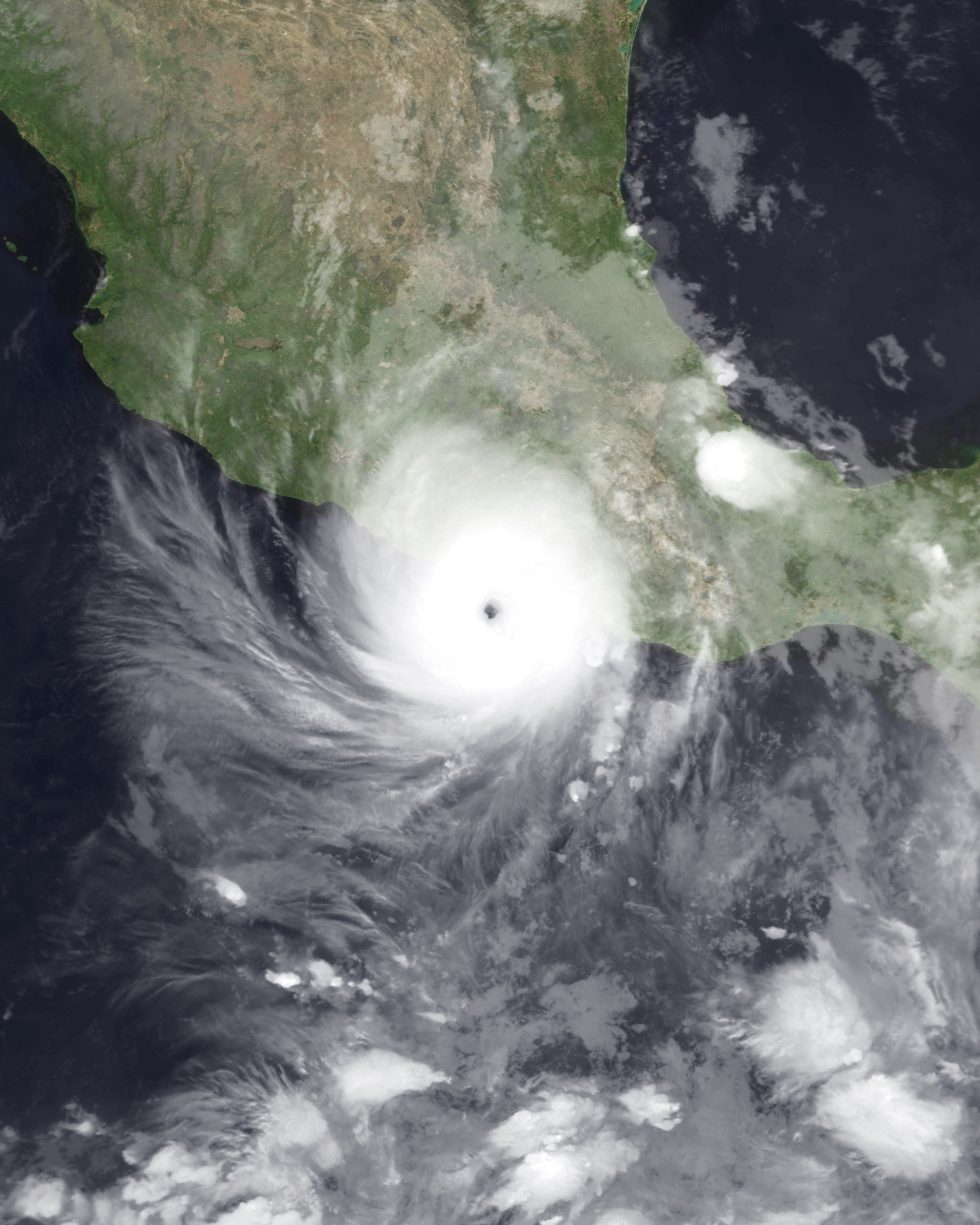
Hurricane Otis, the only Pacific hurricane to make landfall at Category 5 intensity.

Of all of the Category 5 Pacific hurricanes, only six made landfall, all of which occurred during the late-season month of October (except Polo, which made both of its landfalls in late September), and all of which impacted Mexico. Only Hurricane Otis of 2023 was a Category 5 hurricane at landfall. Originally, a hurricane in 1959 was thought to have struck Manzanillo at Category 5 intensity, but a reanalysis in 2016 determined that the storm had peaked as a Category 4 hurricane, and made landfall with the same sustained wind speed as Kenna. Likewise, Patricia was originally determined to have made landfall as a Category 5 hurricane, but was downgraded to a Category 4 hurricane at landfall in post-season reanalysis. This list is not identical to the list of strongest landfalling Pacific hurricanes, as 1976's Hurricane Madeline did not reach Category 5 strength, but made landfall as a stronger Category 4 storm than Kenna. Polo was the only landfalling Category 5 Pacific hurricane to make landfall twice.

The reason for the lack of landfalls is that tropical cyclones in the northern hemisphere usually travel to the west due to easterly trade winds. This means Pacific hurricanes generally move westward out into the open Pacific Ocean. Only rarely do tropical cyclones forming during the peak months of the season make landfall. Closer to the end of the season, the subtropical ridge steers some storms northwards or northeastwards. Storms influenced by this ridge may bring impacts to the western coasts of Mexico and occasionally even Central America. In the central Pacific basin, the North Pacific High keeps tropical cyclones away from the Hawaiian Islands by forcing them southwards. Combined with cooler waters around the Hawaiian Islands that tend to weaken tropical cyclones that approach them, this makes direct impacts on the Hawaiian Islands by tropical cyclones rare.

The following table lists the landfalling Category 5 Pacific hurricanes by landfall intensity.

Name	Year	Category 5	Category 4	Category 3	Category 2	Category 1	Tropical storm	Tropical depression	Refs
Kenna	2002	—	Nayarit	—	—	—	—	—	
Rick	2009	—	—	—	—	—	Sinaloa	—	
Patricia	2015	—	Jalisco	—	—	—	—	—	
Willa	2018	—	—	Sinaloa	—	—	—	—	
Otis	2023	Guerrero	—	—	—	—	—	—	
Polo	2026	—	—	—	Baja California Sur	Sonora	—	—	

=== Other land impacts ===
In addition to these six systems, hurricanes John, Linda, Ioke, Lane, Walaka, and Lowell all threatened land at some point during their existence. John, Ioke and Walaka had minimal impacts on Johnston Atoll, John caused heavy surf in Hawaii, and Walaka passed close to East Island in the French Frigate Shoals. Linda was briefly forecast to approach southern California, and it passed close to Socorro Island near peak intensity. Lane threatened Hawai'i as a major hurricane and dropped more than 40 in (1,000 mm) of rain across many areas. Out of the six aforementioned hurricanes, Lowell had the most significant impact on land, making a direct hit on Kaua'i and Ni'ihau, causing three deaths and over $400 million of damage.

== See also ==
- List of the most intense tropical cyclones
- List of Category 5 Atlantic hurricanes
- List of Eastern Pacific tropical storms
- List of Category 1 Pacific hurricanes
- List of Category 2 Pacific hurricanes
- List of Category 3 Pacific hurricanes
- List of Category 4 Pacific hurricanes
- List of F5 and EF5 tornadoes
