= Hurricane Ioke =

Category 5 Pacific hurricane and typhoon in 2006

Hurricane/Typhoon Ioke
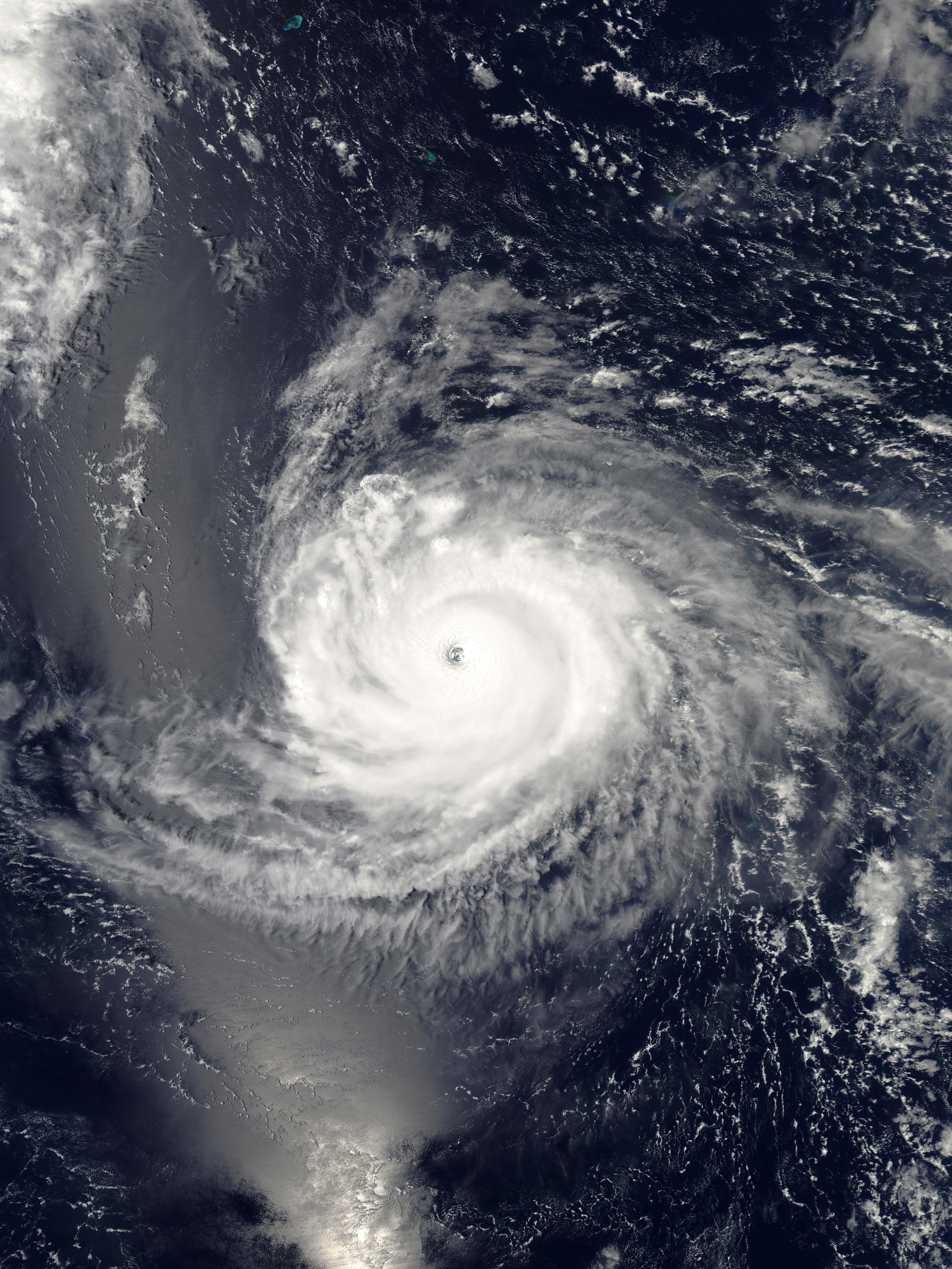
- Hurricane Ioke west of Hawaii near peak intensity on August 25

Meteorological history
- Formed: August 20, 2006
- Extratropical: September 7, 2006
- Dissipated: September 12, 2006

Violent typhoon
- 10-minute sustained (JMA)
- Highest winds: 195 km/h (120 mph)
- Lowest pressure: 920 hPa (mbar); 27.17 inHg

Category 5-equivalent super typhoon
- 1-minute sustained (SSHWS/JTWC)
- Highest winds: 260 km/h (160 mph)
- Lowest pressure: 900 hPa (mbar); 26.58 inHg

Category 5 major hurricane
- 1-minute sustained (SSHWS/NWS)
- Highest winds: 160 mph (260 km/h)
- Lowest pressure: 915 mbar (hPa); 27.02 inHg (Record low in Central Pacific)

Overall effects
- Fatalities: None
- Damage: $88 million (2006 USD)
- Areas affected: Johnston Atoll; Wake Island; Minamitorishima; Alaska
- IBTrACS
- Part of the 2006 Pacific hurricane and typhoon seasons

Hurricane Ioke (/iːˈoʊkeɪ/), also referred to as Typhoon Ioke, was the most intense hurricane ever recorded in the Central Pacific basin, as well as tying for the sixth-most intense Pacific hurricane on record with Hurricane Ava in 1973. It also broke the record for the most generated accumulated cyclone energy for a single storm worldwide, at 85.26. Ioke was the ninth named storm, fifth hurricane, and third major hurricane of the active 2006 Pacific hurricane season.

The cyclone developed in the Intertropical Convergence Zone on August 20 far to the south of Hawaii. Encountering warm waters, little wind shear, and well-defined outflow, Ioke intensified from a tropical depression to Category 4 status within 48 hours. Late on August 22, it rapidly weakened to Category 2 status before crossing over Johnston Atoll. Two days later, favorable conditions again allowed for rapid strengthening, and Ioke attained Category 5 status on August 25 before crossing the International Date Line. As it continued westward, its intensity fluctuated, and on August 31, it passed near Wake Island with winds of 155 mph (250 km/h). Ioke gradually weakened as it turned northwestward and northward, and by September 6, it had transitioned into an extratropical cyclone. The remnants of Ioke accelerated northeastward and ultimately crossed into the Bering Sea, and then the Gulf of Alaska.

Ioke did not affect any permanently-populated areas in the Central Pacific or Western Pacific basins as a hurricane or a typhoon. A crew of 12 people rode out the hurricane in a hurricane-proof bunker on Johnston Atoll; the crew estimated winds reached over 100 mph (160 km/h), which damaged trees on the island but did not impact the island's bird population. The typhoon left moderate damage on Wake Island totaling $88 million (2006 USD, equivalent to $130 million in 2024), including blown off roofs and damaged buildings, though the infrastructure of the island was left intact; all military personnel were evacuated from the island. Later, the extratropical remnants of Ioke produced a severe storm surge along the Alaskan coastline, causing beach erosion.

== Meteorological history ==
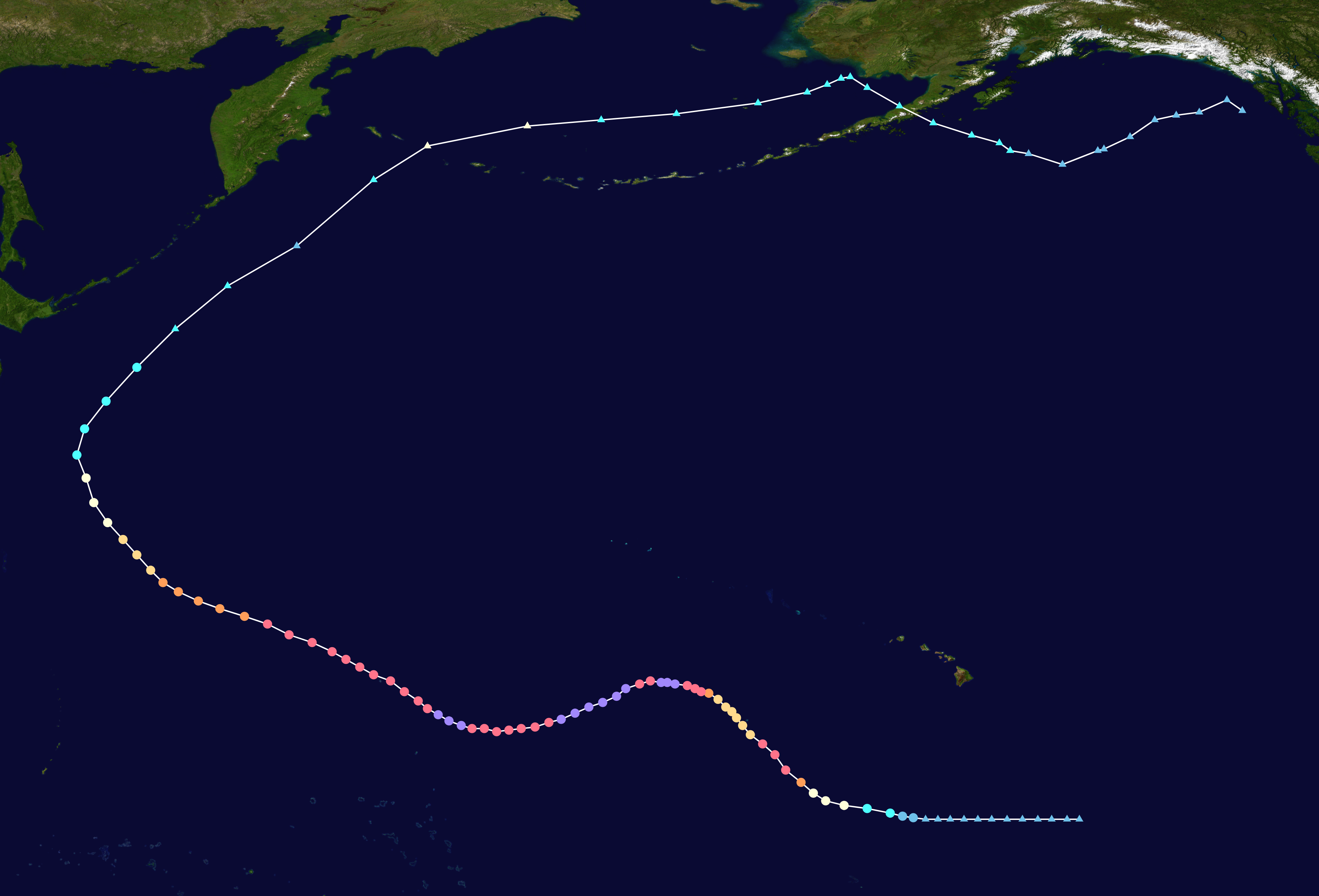
Map plotting the storm's track and intensity, according to the Saffir–Simpson scale Map key Saffir–Simpson scale Tropical depression (≤38 mph, ≤62 km/h) Tropical storm (39–73 mph, 63–118 km/h) Category 1 (74–95 mph, 119–153 km/h) Category 2 (96–110 mph, 154–177 km/h) Category 3 (111–129 mph, 178–208 km/h) Category 4 (130–156 mph, 209–251 km/h) Category 5 (≥157 mph, ≥252 km/h) Unknown Storm type Tropical cyclone Subtropical cyclone Extratropical cyclone, remnant low, tropical disturbance, or monsoon depression

The Intertropical Convergence Zone (ITCZ) spawned a tropical disturbance with a low-level circulation far to the southeast of Hawaiʻi in the middle of August 2006. Under the influence of a strong westward-moving subtropical ridge to its north, the disturbance tracked nearly due westward, with deep convection in the region increasing and decreasing on a daily basis. It slowly became better organized, and early on August 20 the disturbance developed into Tropical Depression One-C while located about 775 mi (1,245 km) south of Honolulu, Hawaii. At the time, there was no convection associated with the ITCZ within 10° Longitude. With wind shear practically non-existent and sea surface temperatures of around 82 °F (28 °C), conditions favored strengthening, and operationally the cyclone was forecast to reach minimal hurricane status within four days before beginning to weaken. The depression attained tropical storm status within six hours of developing. The Central Pacific Hurricane Center designated the system with the name Ioke, Hawaiian for the name Joyce. Subsequently, Ioke quickly strengthened, and by late on August 20 the storm developed a central dense overcast and the beginnings of an eyewall; early on August 21 the storm intensified into a hurricane, just 24 hours after first developing.

Hurricane Ioke steadily deepened as it continued west-northwestward, with better definition of the eye and deepening of the eyewall convection. Near the International Date Line a frontal trough turned the hurricane to the northwest, and after a period of rapid deepening Ioke attained winds of 135 mph (215 km/h) early on August 22 while located about 280 mi (450 km) southeast of Johnston Atoll. After maintaining Category 4 status on the Saffir-Simpson Hurricane Scale for about 18 hours, southwesterly wind shear slightly disrupted the inner core of the hurricane, and Ioke quickly weakened to winds of about 105 mph (169 km/h). Late on August 22, the hurricane passed about 30 mi (48 km) south of Johnston Atoll, with the northeastern portion of the eyewall crossing the atoll early on August 23. After turning westward later in the day, wind shear began to decrease, allowing a second period of rapid deepening. By August 24 the hurricane maintained a 23 mi (37 km) closed eyewall, and on August 25 Ioke attained Category 5 status on the Saffir-Simpson Hurricane Scale while located about 970 mi (1,560 km) west-southwest of the Hawaiian Island of Kauaʻi.

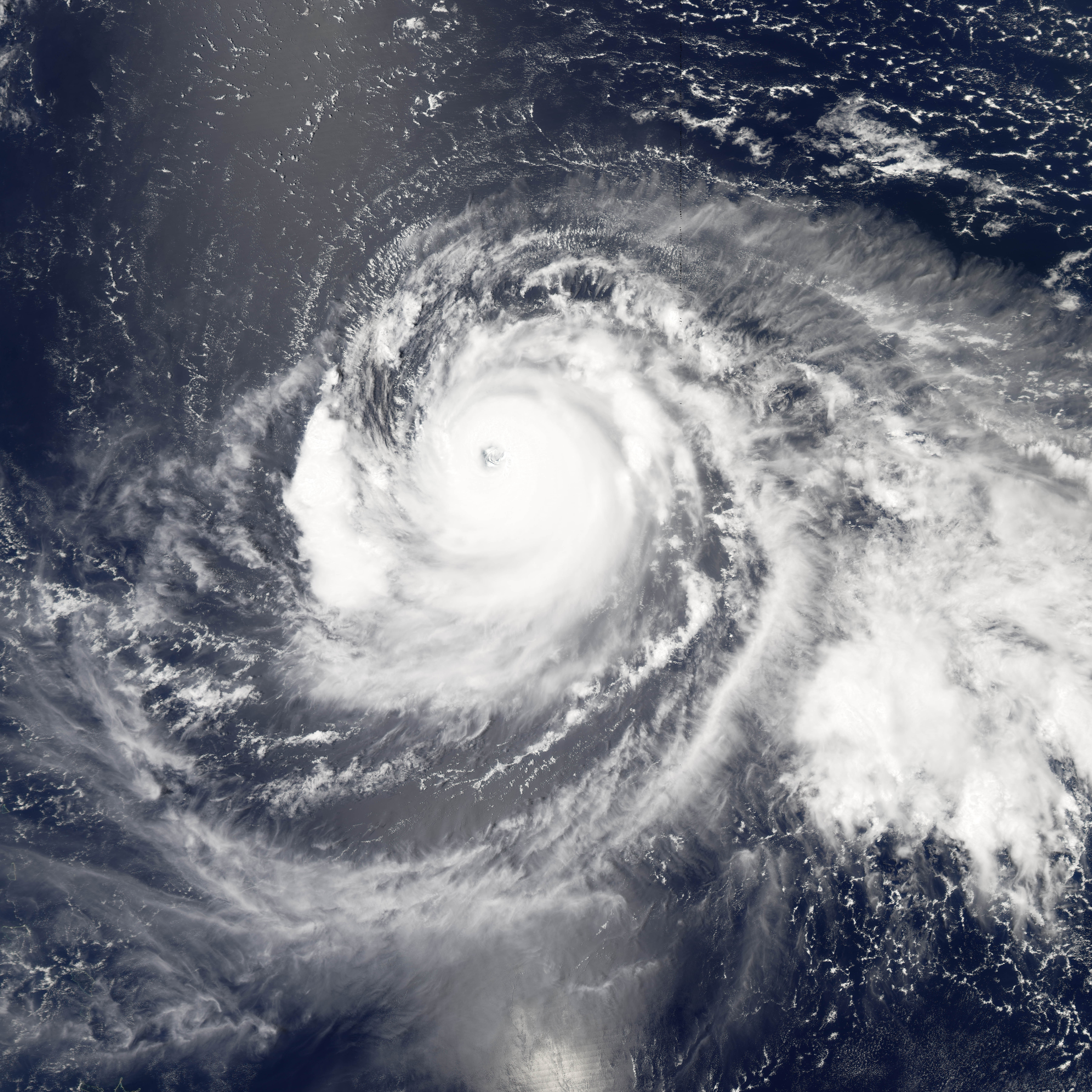
Typhoon Ioke gaining strength after crossing the International Date Line on August 28

After maintaining Category 5 status for about 18 hours, Ioke weakened slightly due to an eyewall replacement cycle. Completing the cycle on August 26, the hurricane restrengthened to Category 5 status. The trough to its west tracked further away from the hurricane, allowing the subtropical ridge to build ahead of the hurricane which turned Ioke to the southwest. The overall environment remained very favorable for sustainment of the powerful cyclone. Strong upper-level cyclones far to its northwest provided outflow channels and light wind shear, with warm water temperatures along its path. With the conditions, the Geophysical Fluid Dynamics Laboratory hurricane model predicted Ioke to reach winds of 220 mph (350 km/h), with a predicted minimum pressure of 860 mbar (25 inHg). Early on August 27, the pressure dropped to 915 mbar (27.0 inHg), and shortly thereafter Ioke crossed the International Date Line, becoming a 160 mph (260 km/h) typhoon.

Unofficially referred as a super typhoon by the Joint Typhoon Warning Center (JTWC), Ioke remained at the equivalence of a Category 5 hurricane for about 12 hours after crossing the Date Line. It then began a slight weakening trend on August 28, due to increased inflow from the ridge to its north. On August 29, the cyclone turned to the west and west-northwest while tracking around the periphery of the subtropical ridge, and Ioke again reached the equivalence of Category 5 status. The Japan Meteorological Agency (JMA) assessed Ioke as attaining peak 10‑minute sustained winds of 120 mph (195 km/h) on August 30. Later that day, the typhoon weakened to the equivalent of a Category 4 hurricane for the final time, and on August 31 Ioke passed very near Wake Island with winds of about 155 mph (250 km/h).

By September 1, increased wind shear and drier air caused the eye of Ioke to become cloud-filled and elongated, and by September 2 Ioke was undergoing another eyewall replacement cycle. On September 2, Ioke passed about 50 mi (80 km) north of Minami-Tori-shima with winds of about 125 mph (200 km/h). Gradual weakening continued, and the typhoon steadily shifted its track to the northwest around the subtropical ridge. A deepening trough turned Ioke to the north-northwest and north, and the cyclone weakened to a tropical storm a few hundred miles east of Japan. After accelerating northeastward, the cyclone began losing tropical characteristics, and the JTWC declared Ioke as an extratropical cyclone on September 6. The JMA maintained Ioke as a typhoon until a day later, and maintained Ioke as a tropical cyclone until it was declared extratropical midday on September 6. The extratropical remnants of Ioke were tracked by the JMA until September 7, when it was located near the Aleutian Islands of Alaska. The storm deepened as it approached the Aleutians, and re-developed winds of hurricane-force. The storm entered the Bering Sea on September 8, and after turning eastward, crossed the Aleutian Islands and entered the Gulf of Alaska. The extratropical remnants of Ioke dissipated near southeastern Alaska on September 12.

== Preparations and impact ==
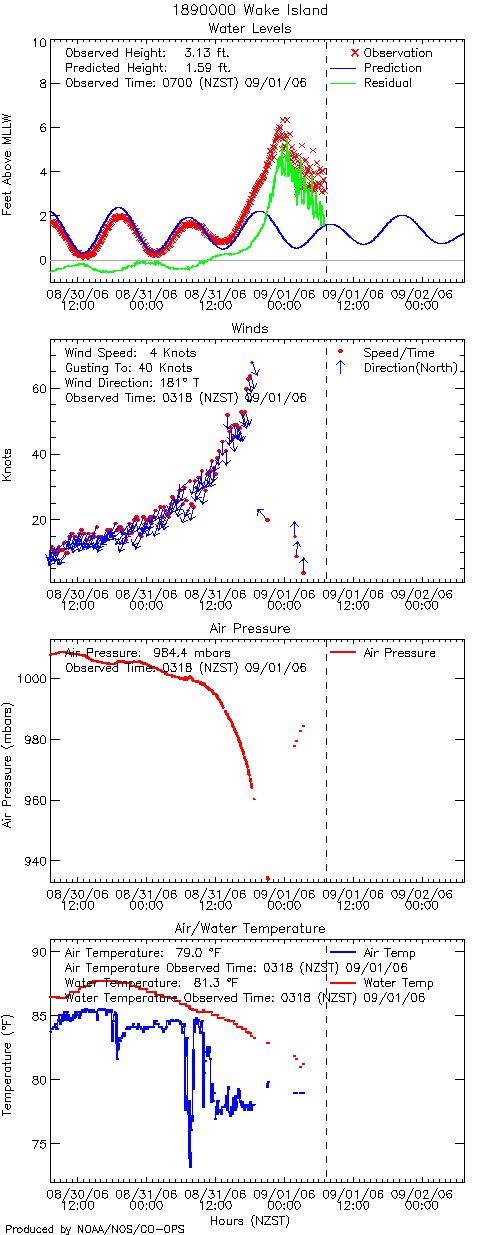
Data recorded at Wake Island during the passage of Ioke

=== Johnston Atoll ===
Late on August 21, about 24 hours prior to its closest approach, the Central Pacific Hurricane Center issued a hurricane warning for uninhabited territory of Johnston Island, due to the uncertainty of whether anyone was on the island. A United States Air Force vessel and a 12-person crew were on the island, and after securing their ship the crew took shelter in a hurricane-proof concrete bunker. There were no meteorological observations on the island, but the crew estimated tropical storm force winds lasted for about 27 hours with hurricane-force winds lasting six to eight hours; peak wind gusts were estimated at 110 to 130 mph (175 to 210 km/h). The crew sustained no injuries, and their ship received only minor damage. Hurricane Ioke, with a portion of its eye crossing the atoll, left an estimated 15% of the palm trees on the island with their tops blown off, with some ironwood trees blown over; the island bird population was unaffected. The hurricane produced rough surf which washed away a portion of a sea wall and an adjacent road.

=== Wake Island ===
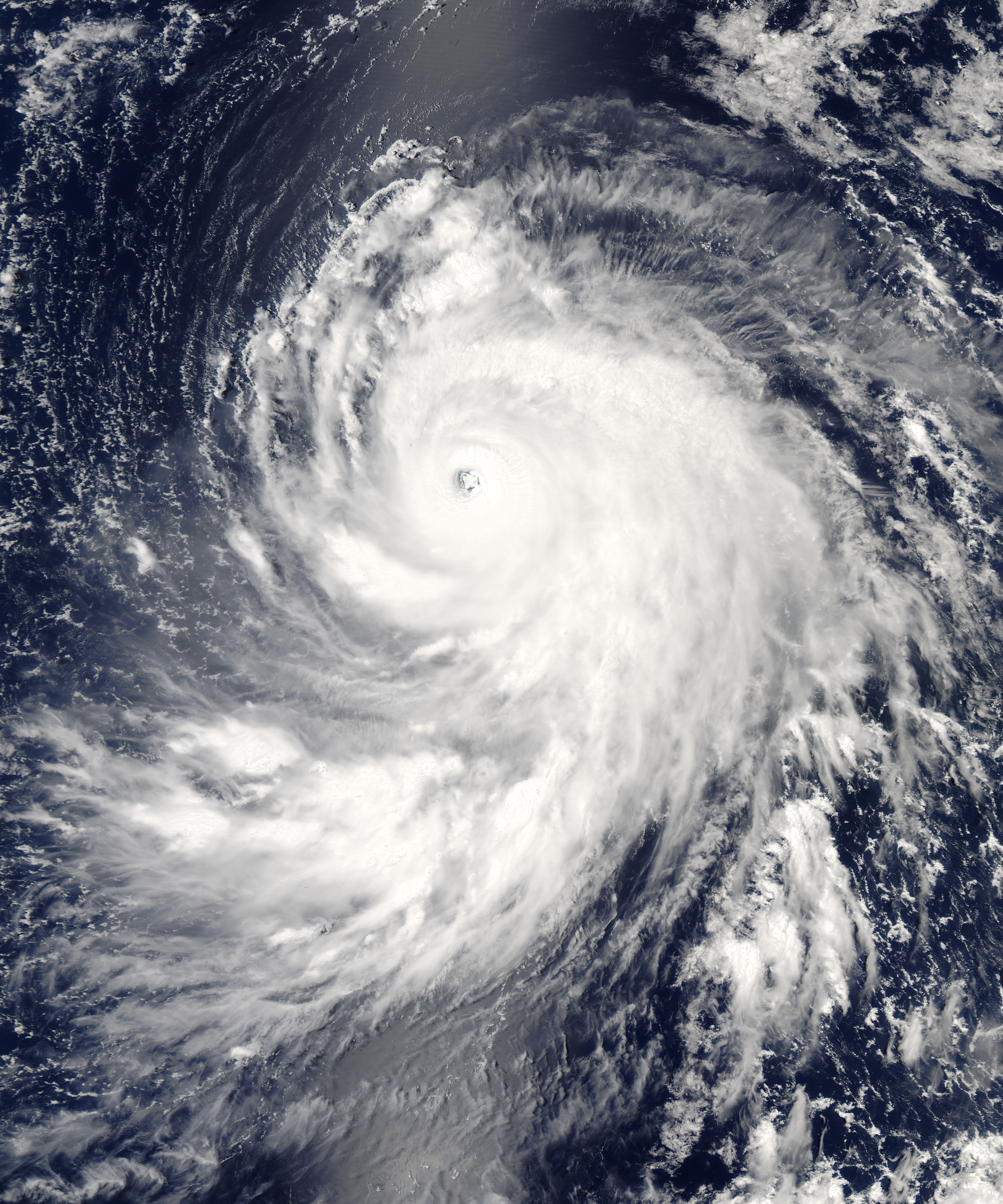
Typhoon Ioke near Wake Island on August 31

Under the threat of the typhoon for several days, two C-17 Globemaster III airlifters evacuated between 188 and 200 military personnel from Wake Island to Hawaii, the first full-scale evacuation of the island since Typhoon Sarah in 1967. A buoy just east of the island recorded a pressure of 921.5 mbar (27.21 inHg) as Ioke crossed directly over it. Before the typhoon passed just north of the island, an anemometer recorded hurricane-force winds with a peak wind gust of 100 mph (160 km/h) before the instrument stopped reporting. Sustained winds were estimated to have reached 155 mph (250 km/h), with gusts to 190 mph (310 km/h). The minimum central pressure recorded on the island was 934 mbar at 0906 UTC on August 31. The typhoon was expected to produce a storm surge of 18 ft (5.5 m) and wave heights of 40 ft (12 m) along Wake Island, where the highest point is 20 ft (6.1 m). Additionally, heavy rainfall from the typhoon left buildings flooded, with 2 ft (0.61 m) of standing water found several days after its passage.

The powerful winds of Typhoon Ioke caused extensive damage to the island's power grid, leaving most power lines to buildings and backup generators damaged. The combination of the winds and storm surge flooding damaged 70% of the buildings in the territory, many of which with moderate roof damage. All low-lying areas were described as being covered with sea water or sand, and the territory was left without running water. Communications were downed on the island, with satellite dishes and cables destroyed. Damage to the infrastructure was extensive, though repairable and less than expected. Damage on the island was estimated at $88 million (2006 USD).

=== Japan and Alaska ===
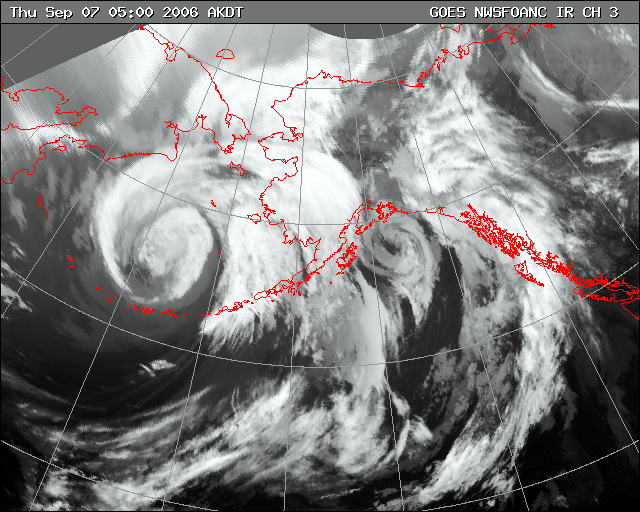
The extratropical remnants of Ioke over the Bering Sea, west of Alaska on September 7

On September 1, the Japan Meteorological Agency ordered the temporary evacuation of its staff on Minami-Tori-shima, under threat of the typhoon. The agency expected high waves and winds on the island. Facilities on the island were damaged, although it was repaired and fully operational within three weeks after the storm.

The extratropical remnant of Ioke produced a storm surge and high surf in excess of 30 ft (9.1 m) along the southwestern coastline of Alaska, which coincided with the astronomical high tide; the combination led to minor flooding along Bristol Bay and Yukon-Kuskokwim Delta. Wind gusts peaked at 84 mph (135 km/h) in Unalaska. The system produced moderate to heavy rainfall across the western portion of Alaska, including daily rainfall records of 1.15 inches (29 mm) at Bethel and 0.67 in (17 mm) at Kotzebue. Rainfall continued into the southeastern portion of the state, contributing to above-normal rainfall totals near Juneau. Total damage in Alaska was estimated at $113,000 (2015 USD).

== Aftermath and records ==
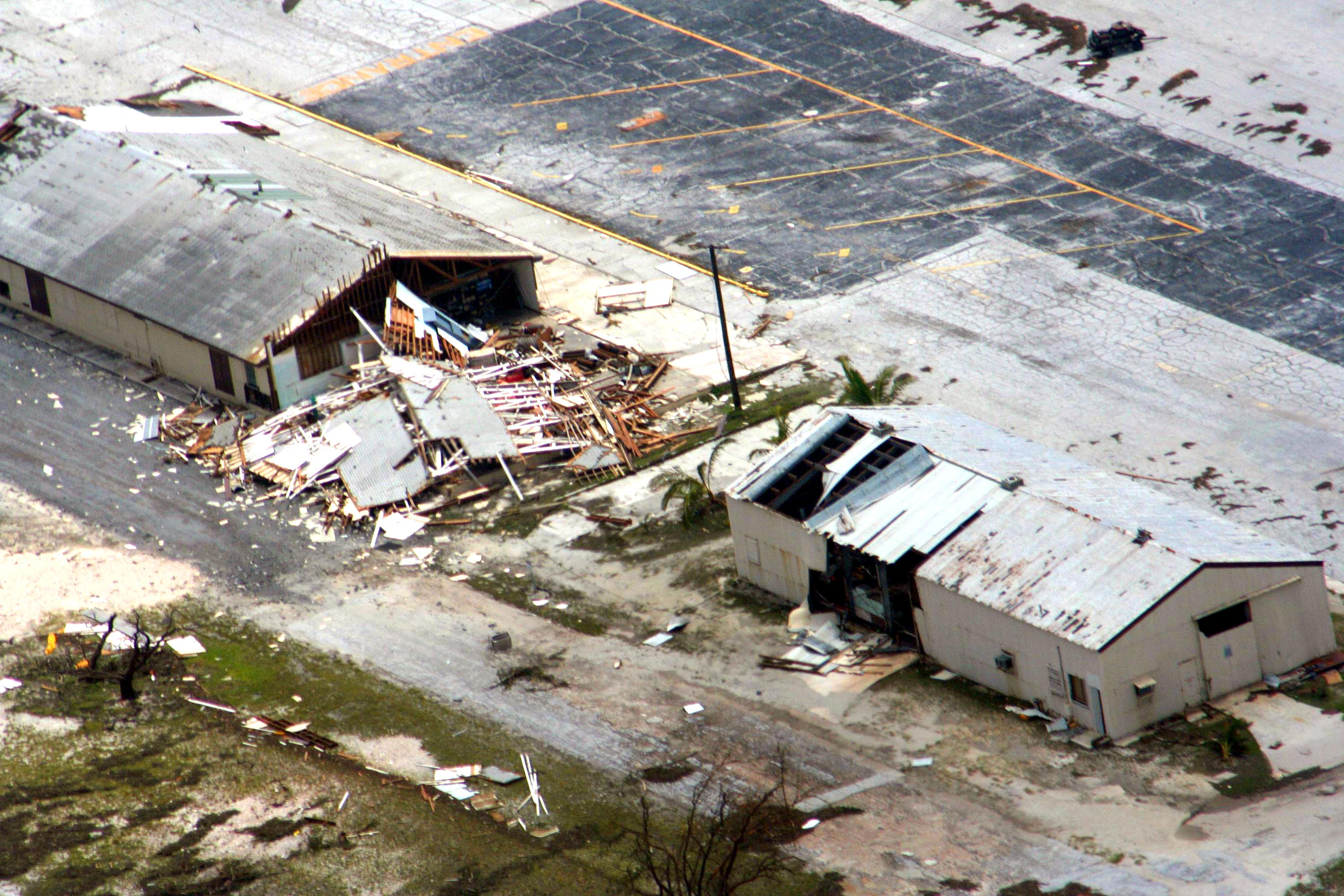
Damage on Wake Island after Ioke

The United States Coast Guard first performed an aerial assessment of damage on Wake Island on September 2, three days after the typhoon struck. The flight indicated an overall damage smaller than expected, and reported a lack of oil spill or hazardous material leak. The U.S. Coast Guard arrived by boat with a team on September 7, with a preliminary damage assessment completed four days later; the team repaired a generator to provide power. The United States Navy's combat stores ship, the USNS San Jose (T-AFS-7), and sixteen members United States Air Force's 36th Contingency Response Group at Andersen AFB, Guam arrived on September 8 and analyzed the stability of the airfield along with assisting in clean-up efforts, and after core tests workers cleared the runway to allow flights onto the territory. On September 13, a group of engineers restored power on the island. About two weeks after the cyclone, several buildings were operational.

Most intense Pacific hurricanes
| Rank | Hurricane | Season | Pressure | |
| Rank | Hurricane | Season | hPa | inHg |
|---|---|---|---|---|
| 1 | Patricia | 2015 | 872 | 25.75 |
| 2 | Polo | 2026 | 892 | 26.34 |
| 3 | Linda | 1997 | 902 | 26.64 |
| 4 | Rick | 2009 | 906 | 26.76 |
| 5 | Kenna | 2002 | 913 | 26.96 |
| 6 | Ava | 1973 | 915 | 27.02 |
| 6 | Ioke | 2006 | 915 | 27.02 |
| 8 | Marie | 2014 | 918 | 27.11 |
| 8 | Odile | 2014 | 918 | 27.11 |
| 10 | Guillermo | 1997 | 919 | 27.14 |
Listing is only for tropical cyclones in the Pacific Ocean north of the equator and east of the International Dateline

Hurricane Ioke became one of only eight hurricanes to reach Category 5 status on the Saffir-Simpson Hurricane Scale in the Central North Pacific Ocean. The others were Patsy in 1959, Emilia, Gilma, and John in 1994, Lane and Walaka in 2018, as well as Lowell in 2026. With an estimated minimum central pressure of 915 mbar (27.019 inHg), the cyclone attained the lowest estimated surface pressure for any hurricane within the basin, surpassing the previous minimum set by Hurricane Gilma in 1994. Ioke maintained at least Category 4 status for 198 consecutive hours, which was the longest continuous time period at that intensity ever observed for any tropical cyclone anywhere on Earth. Additionally, the cyclone remained at the equivalence of a super typhoon for 174 consecutive hours, which was also a record.

The name Ioke was retired from future use in the central Pacific by the World Meteorological Organization following the 2006 season. The name Iopa was chosen as its replacement.

== See also ==
- List of Category 5 Pacific hurricanes
- List of Alaska tropical cyclones
- Typhoon Olive (1952)
- Typhoon Ophelia (1960)
- Hurricane John (1994) – The second longest-lasting tropical cyclone ever recorded globally.
- Typhoon Oliwa (1997) – A Category 5 super typhoon that crossed the Central Pacific.
- Hurricane Genevieve (2014) – A Category 3 hurricane that crossed three basins and became a Category 5-equivalent typhoon.
- Hurricane Hector (2018) – An erratic Category 4 hurricane that crossed three basins.
- Hurricane Walaka (2018) – The third most intense hurricane formed in the Central Pacific.
- Cyclone Freddy (2023) – The longest-lasting, and second highest accumulated cyclone energy (ACE) of any tropical cyclone on record.
