= Port of Acapulco =

Acapulco
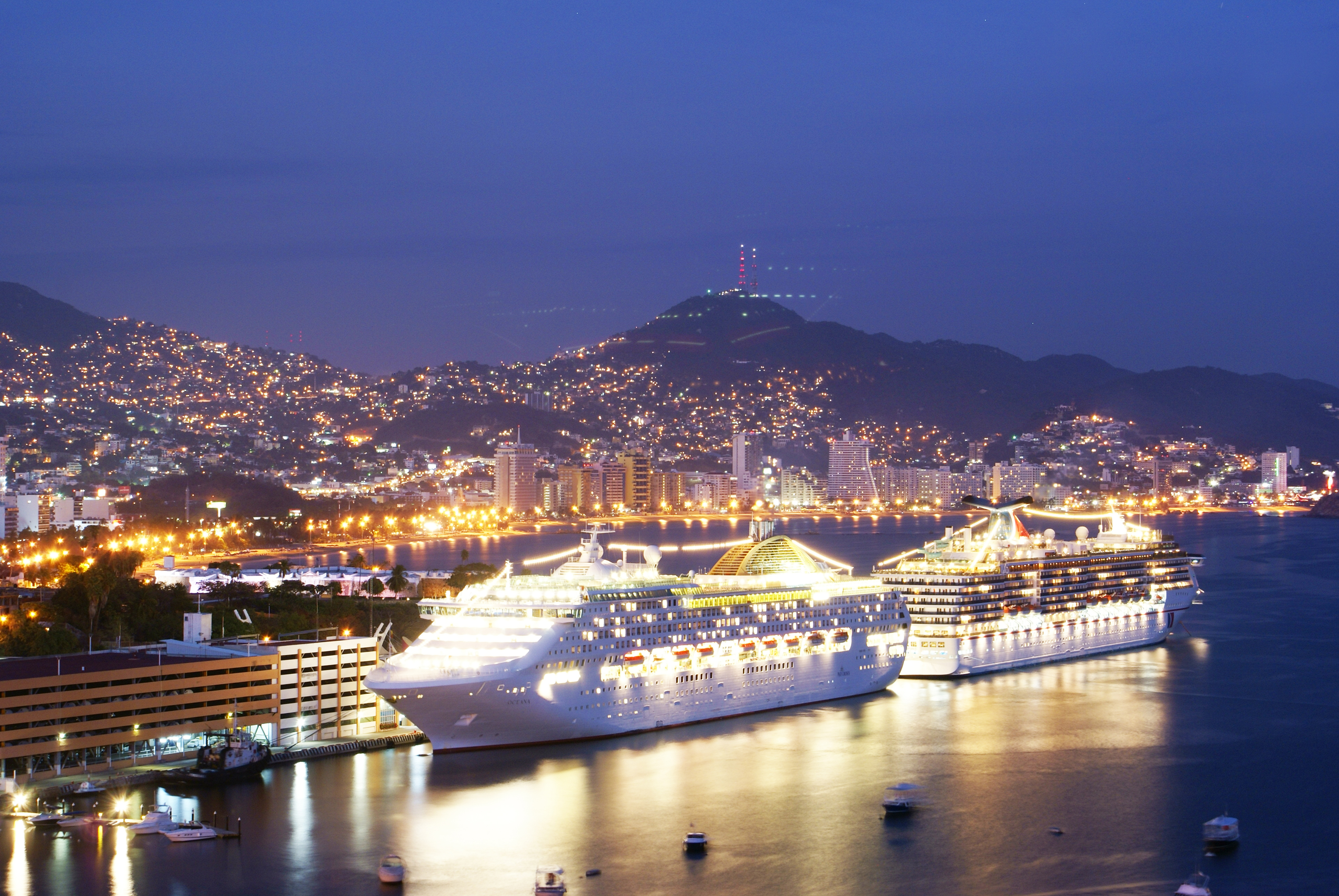
- Interactive map of Acapulco
- Location in Mexico

Location
- Country: Mexico
- Location: Acapulco, Guerrero
- Coordinates: 16°49′N 99°54′W
- UN/LOCODE: MXACA

Details
- No. of berths: 7
- Draft depth: 12.6 metres (41 ft)

Statistics
- Website puertoacapulco.com.mx

The Port of Acapulco is a port facility located on Mexico's Pacific coast in the state of Guerrero, in the naturally sheltered Bahía de Acapulco, 280 km ESE of Lázaro Cárdenas, Michoacán, and 300 km SSW of Mexico City.

One of Mexico's main cruise ports, Acapulco also handles petroleum products, breakbulk and Ro-Ro.
