= Hurricane Lane (2018) =

Category 5 Pacific hurricane

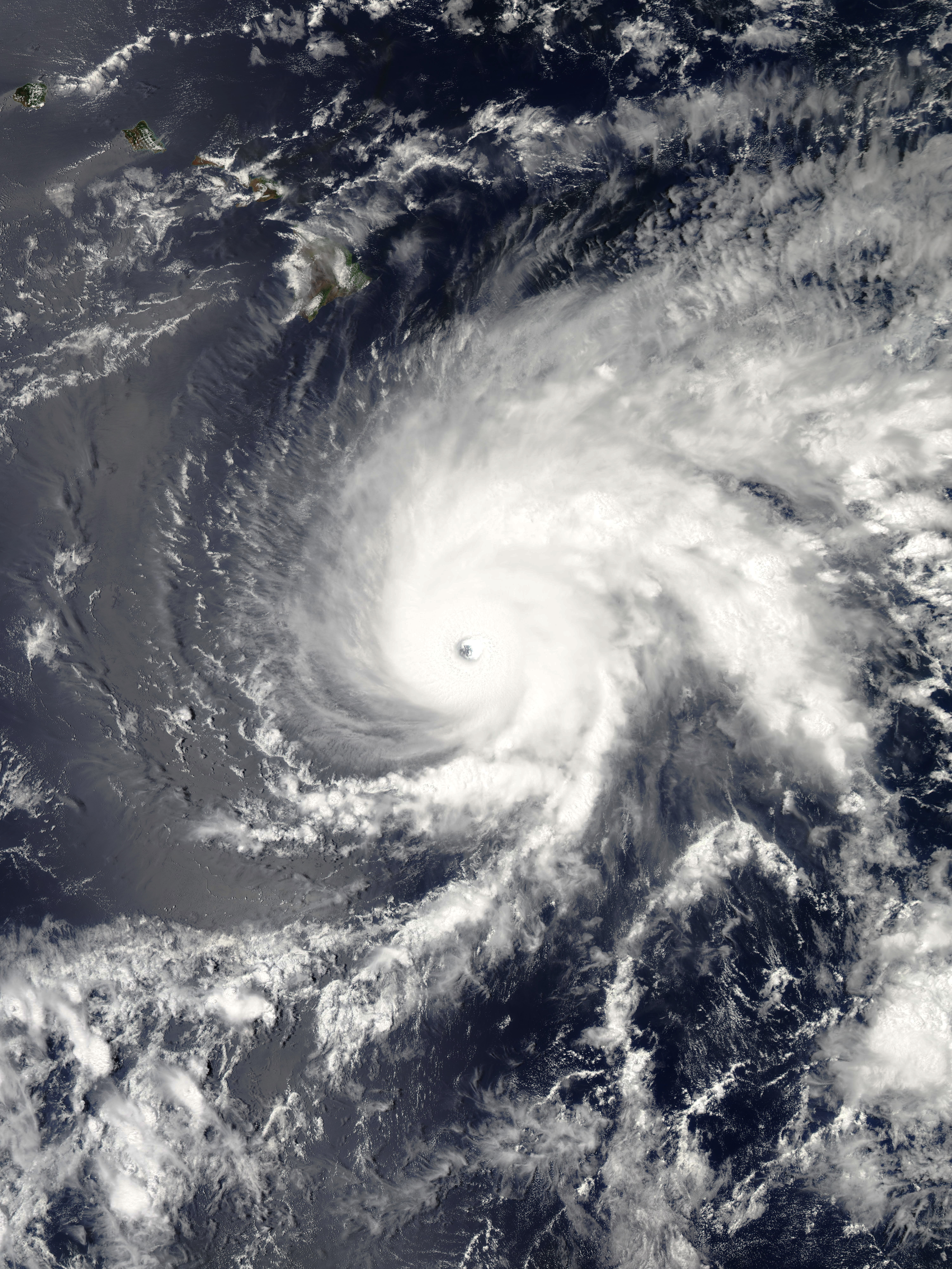
- Hurricane Lane at peak intensity southeast of Hawaii on August 22

Meteorological history
- Formed: August 15, 2018
- Remnant low: August 28, 2018
- Dissipated: August 29, 2018

Category 5 major hurricane
- 1-minute sustained (SSHWS/NWS)
- Highest winds: 160 mph (260 km/h)
- Lowest pressure: 926 mbar (hPa); 27.34 inHg

Overall effects
- Fatalities: 1 total
- Damage: $250 million (2018 USD)
- Areas affected: Hawaii
- IBTrACS /
- Part of the 2018 Pacific hurricane season

Hurricane Lane was a powerful tropical cyclone that brought torrential rainfall and strong winds to Hawaii during late August 2018. The storm was the wettest on record in Hawaii, with peak rainfall accumulations of 58 inches (1,473 mm) along the eastern slopes of Mauna Kea. The twelfth named storm, sixth hurricane, fourth major hurricane, and the first of three Category 5 hurricanes of the record-breaking 2018 Pacific hurricane season, Lane originated from an area of low pressure that formed well southwest of Mexico on August 13. Tracking west through a region of favorable atmospheric and oceanic conditions, the system steadily intensified over the following days. It reached an initial peak as a Category 4 hurricane on August 18. Temporarily inhibited by more hostile conditions, the hurricane weakened slightly before regaining strength and reaching Category 5 status on August 22 to the south of Hawaii. Lane peaked with winds of 160 mph (255 km/h) (Note: All winds are one-minute sustained unless otherwise noted.) and a barometric pressure of 926 mbar (hPa; 27.34 inHg). Thereafter, the hurricane turned north and slowed. During this period, torrential rains battered much of the Hawaiian Islands. Unfavorable conditions again affected the hurricane, and it degraded to a tropical depression by August 28 before dissipating the following day.

Lane prompted the issuance of hurricane watches and warnings for every island in Hawaii. From August 22 to 26, Lane brought heavy rain to much of the Hawaiian Windward Islands, which caused flash flooding and mudslides. Effects were most significant in and around Hilo where multiple neighborhoods were flooded. Across the Big Island, 159 structures were damaged or destroyed. Strong winds downed trees and power lines on Maui, and brush fires ignited on both Maui and Oahu. One fatality occurred on Kauaʻi. Landslides and flooding damaged roads statewide; repairs concluded in April 2019. Total economic losses from the hurricane exceeded $250 million. (Note: All monetary values are in 2018 United States dollars unless otherwise noted.) On September 27, 2018, President Donald Trump declared much of Hawaii a disaster area; the Federal Emergency Management Agency ultimately provided about $10 million in aid.

== Meteorological history ==
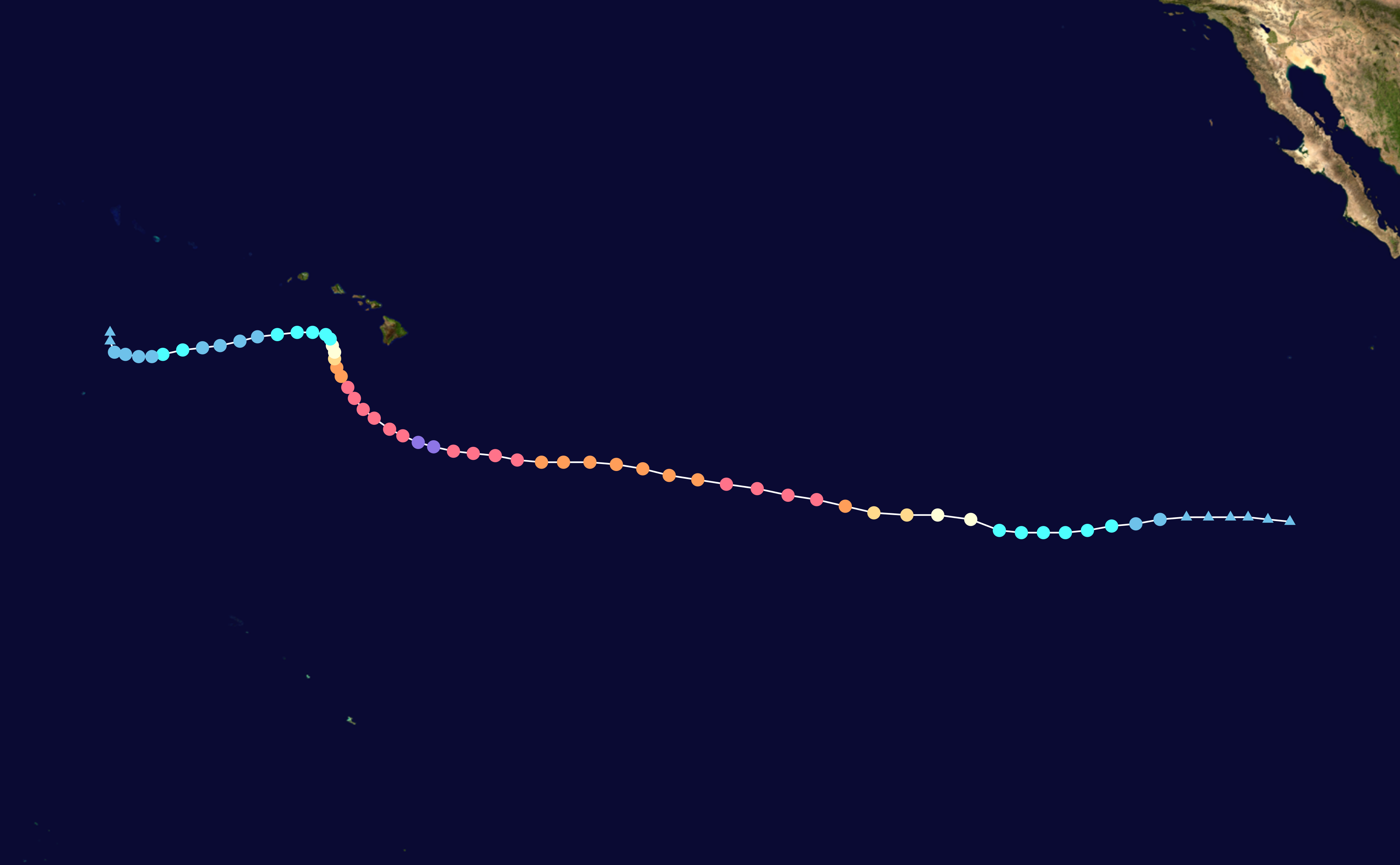
Map plotting the storm's track and intensity, according to the Saffir–Simpson scale Map key Saffir–Simpson scale Tropical depression (≤38 mph, ≤62 km/h) Tropical storm (39–73 mph, 63–118 km/h) Category 1 (74–95 mph, 119–153 km/h) Category 2 (96–110 mph, 154–177 km/h) Category 3 (111–129 mph, 178–208 km/h) Category 4 (130–156 mph, 209–251 km/h) Category 5 (≥157 mph, ≥252 km/h) Unknown Storm type Tropical cyclone Subtropical cyclone Extratropical cyclone, remnant low, tropical disturbance, or monsoon depression

On July 31, 2018, a tropical wave emerged off the west coast of Africa. It moved west across the Atlantic with little to no convection (shower and thunderstorm activity) before crossing Central America and entering the Eastern Pacific basin on August 8. Intermittent convective activity ignited on August 11, and an area of low pressure consolidated on August 13 about 880 mi (1,415 km) southwest of Baja California Sur. Increased organization of the system marked its development into a tropical depression, the fourteenth of the season, by 00:00 UTC on August 15. A large subtropical ridge to the north steered the nascent system on a general west to west-northwest course, a direction it would maintain for about a week. Based on Dvorak satellite intensity estimates, the system is estimated to have become a tropical storm later that day. At that time, the National Hurricane Center (NHC) (Note: The National Hurricane Center is the Regional Specialized Meteorological Center for the northeast Pacific Ocean from the coast of Central America west until 140°W.) assigned it the name Lane.

Favorable environmental conditions, including warm sea surface temperatures averaging 81.5–82.4 °F (27.5–28 °C) and low wind shear, fostered intensification. From August 16 to 18, Lane underwent rapid intensification. A defined inner-core with symmetrical outflow aloft organized by August 17, and microwave satellite imagery showed an eye at the lower levels of the cyclone. This marked its intensification to a hurricane, with winds exceeding 74 mph (119 km/h). By the morning of August 18, the storm displayed a well-defined 17 mi (27 km) wide eye surrounded by very deep convection. Around 12:00 UTC that day, Lane reached its initial peak intensity with winds of 140 mph (225 km/h), approximately 1,810 mi (2,915 km) southwest of Baja California Sur. This ranked it as a Category 4 on the Saffir–Simpson scale.

NOAA hurricane hunters flying through the eye of Lane early on August 22. Their measurements prompted the upgrade of Lane to a Category 5 hurricane

Early on August 19, the Central Pacific Hurricane Center (CPHC) (Note: The Central Pacific Hurricane Center is the Regional Specialized Meteorological Center for the central Pacific Ocean between 140°W and 180°.) assumed responsibility of the storm after it crossed 140°W. Increasing wind shear disrupted the storm's organization, elongating convection east-to-west and opening the eyewall to the southwest. Despite repeated forecasts calling for the storm to continue weakening, Lane maintained its intensity throughout the day. Hurricane Hunters began aerial reconnaissance on August 20, and found the system to be stronger than indicated by satellite estimates. Approaching the western edge of the subtropical ridge, Lane's forward motion slowed and gradually shifted northwest. The hurricane's eye became distinct again on August 21 and accompanying convection became more intense. Reconnaissance data around 09:00 UTC showed continued strengthening, with a blend of observed data yielding an estimated intensity of 150 mph (240 km/h). Continued observations by hurricane hunters indicated Lane achieved Category 5 strength around 00:00 UTC on August 22. They observed winds of 168 mph (270 km/h) at this time; however, the CPHC assessed its intensity at 160 mph (255 km/h) based on a blend of observations and satellite estimates. Stepped frequency microwave radiometer (SFMR) data from hurricane hunters indicated peak surface winds of 177 mph (285 km/h) at around 06:00 UTC, and a dropsonde observed the central pressure fell to a minimum of 926 mbar (hPa; 926 mbar (27.34 inHg).

Satellite loop of Hurricane Lane shortly after being upgraded to a Category 5 hurricane on August 22, 2018

At its peak on August 22, Hurricane Lane was roughly 320 mi (515 km) southeast of South Point, Hawaii. Increased wind shear from an approaching upper-level trough induced weakening once more by August 23. Continued weakening the following day included degradation of Lane's eye and its convective structure became increasingly elliptical. During this time, the hurricane turned almost due north. Increasingly intense wind shear caused the cyclone's inner core to collapse. The circulation center became exposed with meager convection restricted to the northeast early on August 25, marking Lane's degradation to a tropical storm. The abrupt weakening coincided with the storm turning back west within the easterlies, away from the Hawaiian Islands. At its closest approach, Lane was located approximately 150 mi (240 km) south and west of the main islands. Although the storm itself continued to weaken, shower and thunderstorms to the east of its center resulted in torrential rain across Hawaii. From August 26 to 27, Lane fluctuated in strength between tropical storm and tropical depression status. Sporadic convection, sometimes intense, occurred during this period. On August 27, Lane briefly reorganized with a burst of convection over its center and banding features developing to the east. The next day, the convection became far removed from the center and with no further development, the system degenerated into a remnant low. The circulation became increasingly distorted and the cyclone dissipated later on August 29 as it was absorbed into an upper-level low. This upper-level low eventually developed into a subtropical storm along the International Date Line on September 1, and it was given the designation 96C. This subtropical storm proceeded to move northward for another few days, before it was absorbed into another extratropical cyclone on September 4.

== Preparations ==
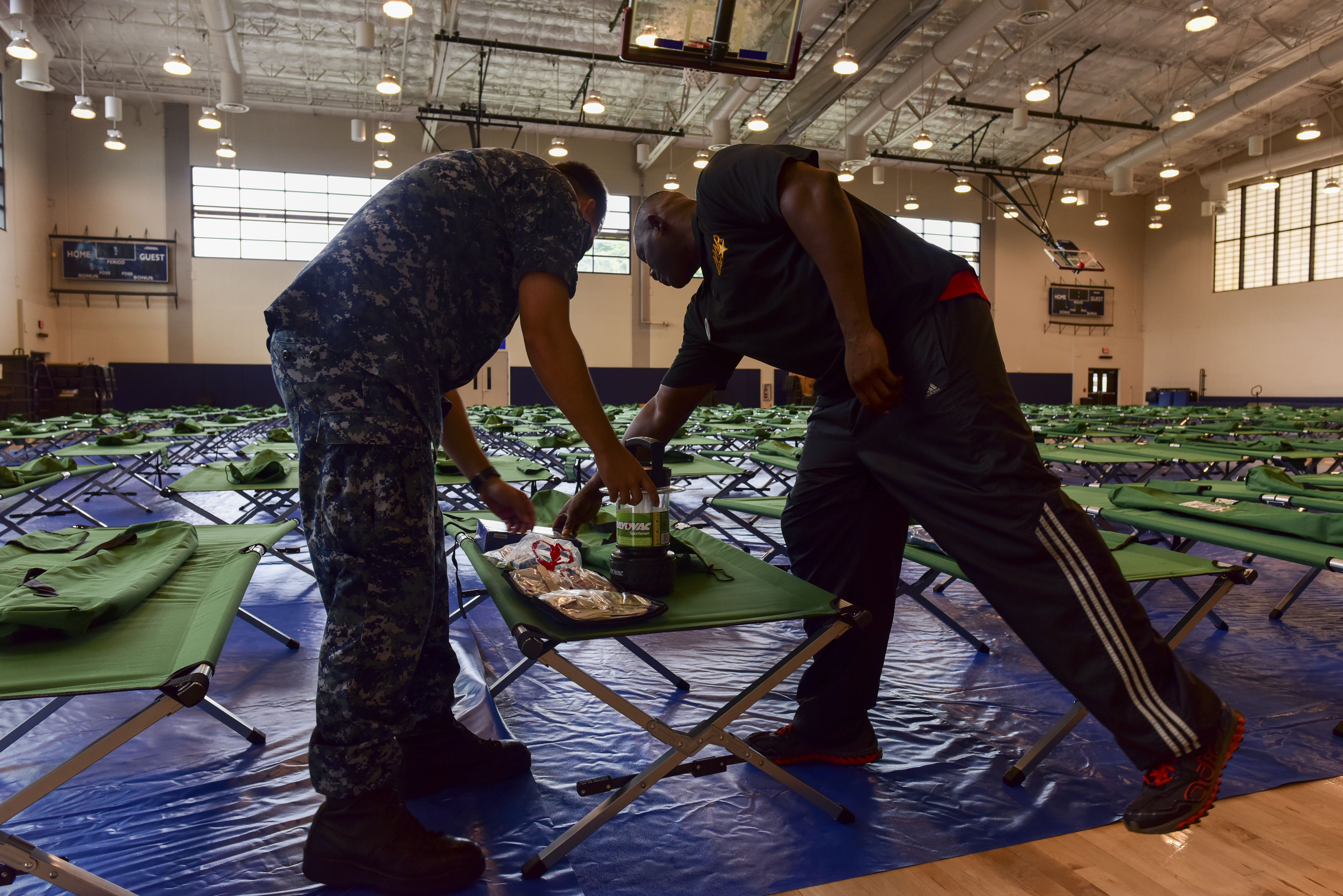
Morale, Welfare and Recreation employees going over the emergency preparation kits at the Joint Base Pearl Harbor–Hickam in advance of Hurricane Lane

Hurricane Lane was the most powerful storm to threaten Hawaii since Hurricane Iniki in 1992. On August 21–22, as Lane approached the Hawaiian Islands, hurricane watches and warnings were issued for Maui County, Hawaii County, Oahu, and Kauaʻi County. Uncertainty in how close the hurricane would approach led to watches and warnings covering a broad area. Increased forecaster confidence on August 24 led to a reduction in the extent of warnings. Degradation of the cyclone and its concurrent turn away from Hawaii on August 25–26 prompted the cessation of watches and warnings.

All school districts statewide closed between August 22 and 24, and all non-essential state employees on the Big Island and Maui were told to stay home on those days. Hawaiian Airlines waived change fees for all tickets involving Hawaii from August 21–26. American Airlines, Hawaiian Airlines, and United Airlines cancelled more than two dozen domestic and international flights at Honolulu International Airport, Hilo International Airport, Kahului Airport, and Lihue Airport. All commercial harbors in Hilo and Kawaihae suspended operations on August 23. Numerous state parks and hiking trails closed under the threat of flooding and landslides.

On August 22, the United States Navy and Air Force repositioned assets statewide, primarily at the Joint Base Pearl Harbor–Hickam, to protect them from the hurricane. Navy vessels not undergoing maintenance were ordered to sortie, though remain in close enough proximity for quick relief efforts if needed. Aircraft were stored in hangars or flown to airfields outside the hurricane's projected path. The National Memorial Cemetery of the Pacific closed on August 24 and 25 and tours at the USS Arizona Memorial were suspended. President Donald Trump issued an emergency declaration for Hawaii. The Department of Homeland Security's Federal Emergency Management Agency (FEMA) was authorized to coordinate disaster relief beginning on August 22 and continuing indefinitely. More than 3,900 FEMA personnel were deployed or already in the state to assist with recovery efforts. The Hawaii National Guard placed 280 active duty members—including 120 already responding to the Kīlauea volcano—on alert for relief efforts. A further 3,000 personnel from the state's Army National Guard and Air National Guard were available if requested. The Red Cross opened 36 shelters statewide, with 825 people using them by the time the hurricane arrived.

== Impact ==
Hurricane Lane produced record-breaking rain across the Hawaiian Islands. The resulting floods and landslides caused extensive damage and one fatality. More than 3,000 insurance claims for damage were made statewide and total economic losses exceeded $250 million.

=== Big Island ===
Widespread flooding occurred throughout the Big Island, with many rivers becoming torrents

Although Hurricane Lane remained west of the Big Island, tremendous amounts of rain battered eastern areas of the island from August 22 to 26. Accumulations were greatest along the eastern slopes of Mauna Kea with a maximum of 58 in (1,473 mm) at Kahūnā Falls in Akaka Falls State Park, as measured by a private weather station. This made Lane the wettest tropical cyclone on record in the state of Hawaii, surpassing the previous peak of 52 in (1,300 mm) during Hurricane Hiki in 1950. Lane's peak rainfall total was also the second-highest recorded from a tropical cyclone within the United States, surpassed only by Hurricane Harvey in the preceding year. Hilo saw its wettest three-day period on record with 31.85 in (809 mm) of precipitation observed; 15 in (380 mm) fell on August 24 alone, marking the fifth-wettest day in the city's recorded history. Additional storm-total accumulations include 49.48 in (1,257 mm) at Waiākea-Uka, 48.52 in (1,232 mm) at the USGS Saddle Quarry station, and 48.13 in (1,223 mm) at the Waiakea Experiment Station in Hilo. Precipitation in the Hilo Region was likely amplified by the terrain on the windward side of the island, the position of rainbands, the environment generated by the cyclone, and katabatic winds. Along the erupting Kīlauea volcano, the rain led to minor rockfalls. The porous nature of volcanic rock and land in the Puna District served to mitigate the amount of runoff.

Flooding closed numerous roads island-wide, including portions of Route 11 and 19 along the Belt Road. Multiple landslides covered portions of the Akoni Pule Highway. In and around Hilo, swollen rivers inundated homes and 100 people required rescue in the Reeds Island subdivision. Water reached a depth of 5 ft (1.5 m) along Kaiulani Street. Six classrooms at Waiakea Elementary School also flooded, as was much of the Hilo Bayfront. Residents in Hawaiian Acres were forced to abandon their cars on flooded roads and landslides destroyed two homes. Overflowing sewage pumps spilled 9,000,000 US gallons (34,000,000 L) of wastewater into Hilo Bay. A small waterspout occurred off the coast of Paukaa on August 23. Across the Big Island, 3 homes were destroyed, 23 homes and 3 businesses suffered major flood damage, while another 113 homes and 17 businesses experienced minor damage. In Kurtistown, a bonsai nursery suffered $3–5 million in lost inventory, including 100 trees described as "world-class". Power outages affected 4,500 customers islandwide. Damage to public infrastructure exceeded $20 million.

=== Maui and Molokaʻi ===
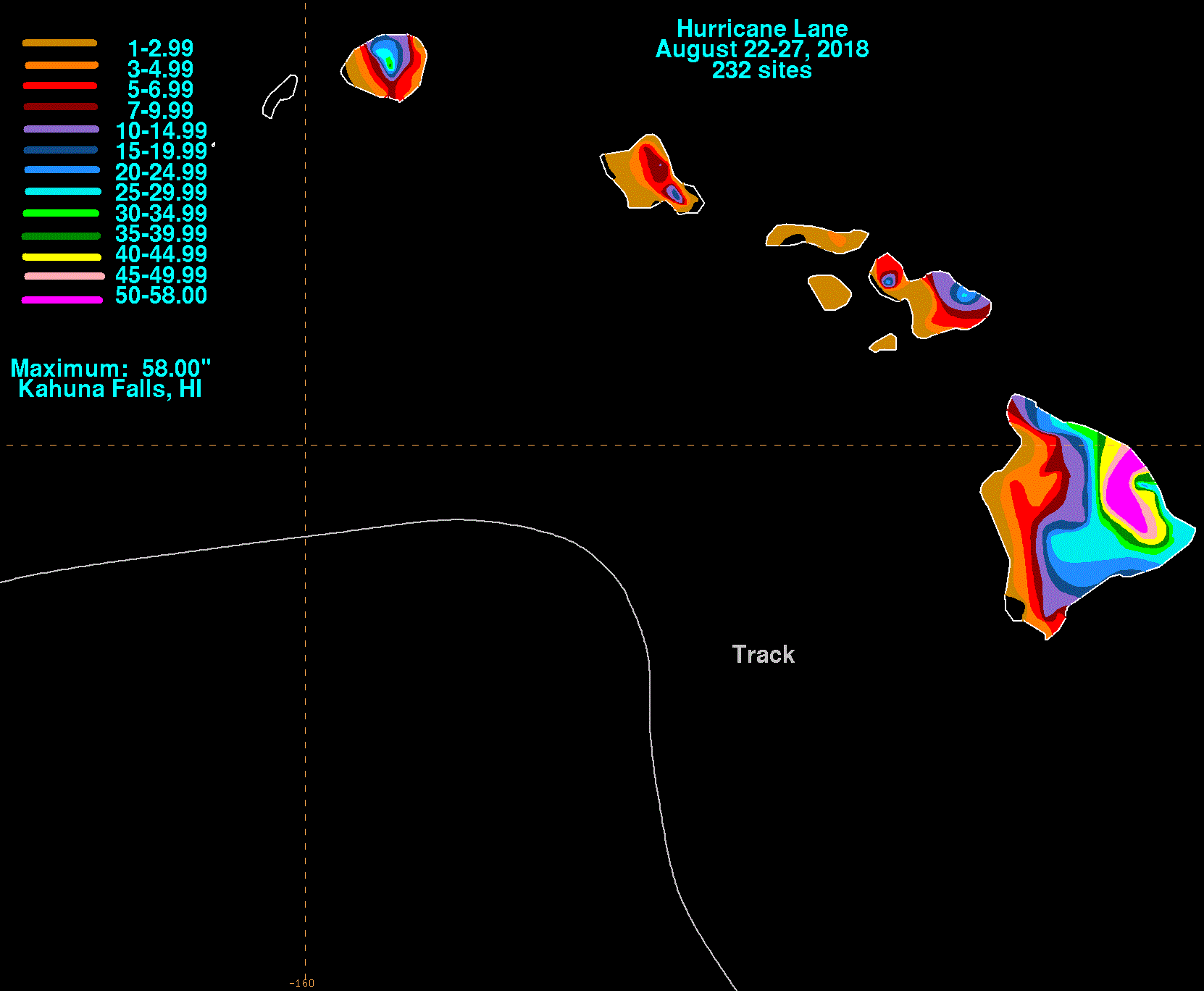
Torrential rains fell across the Hawaiian Islands, with accumulations in excess of 50 in (1,300 mm) occurring across the eastern slopes of the Big Island.

Prior to Lane's arrival in Maui, western areas of the island were suffering from a drought. The island's mountainous terrain results in sharp rainfall gradients during summer months, limiting rainfall along western slopes and enhancing it on eastern slopes. As Lane approached on August 23, enhanced flow associated with it and a ridge to the north produced strong, dry winds in western Maui. Sustained winds reached 44 mph (71 km/h) in Makawao on this day. The strong winds downed trees and power lines, cutting power to 11,450 customers across Maui and Molokai. Downed power lines prevented evacuated residents from returning home in the wake of the storm. Fires sparked in areas with dry brush and grew rapidly, fanned by wind gusts estimated at 60–80 mph (97–129 km/h). The largest of the fires occurred in Kauaula Valley, burning 2,800 acres (11 km^{2}) and injuring two people, one due to burns and another due to smoke inhalation. Firefighters observed fire whirls as tall as 30 ft (9.1 m). Six hundred people were evacuated due to wildfires overall, including some from a hurricane shelter. The fire destroyed 22 homes, leaving 60 people homeless; it also burned 30 vehicles. Flames reached the field track at Lahainaluna High School. Damage from the Kauaula Valley fire alone amounted to $4.3 million. A second fire ignited near the Lahaina Civic Center, burning 800 acres (3.2 km^{2}) and one home in Kaanapali. Twenty-six evacuees staying at Lahaina Intermediate School were forced to relocate due to the fire. Around a dozen agricultural businesses and farmers suffered hundreds of thousands of dollars in losses from the fires, with some losing large portions of their crop and equipment. One cacao farm saw total defoliation of its trees from strong winds. The Ku’ia Agricultural Education Center lost 60 percent of its crop and 40 percent of its infrastructure. A third fire occurred near Maalaea, though it burned without incident. Adverse conditions prevented firefighters from utilizing helicopters and difficult roads slowed response time. Once winds from Lane subsided on August 26, firefighters were able to contain the blazes. The cause of the fires was never ascertained; however, the Maui County Police Department determined arson was not involved.

Precipitation across Maui predominantly fell on August 25, with a peak accumulation of 25.58 in (650 mm) in West Wailuaiki. Hana Airport and Haiku both observed approximately 10.5 in (270 mm) of rain. The rainfall aided firefighters in containing the brushfires. Multiple landslides occurred along the Hana and Kahekili highways. A bridge along the former near Keʻanae was overtopped by 3 ft (0.91 m) of water, damaging a parapet and part of the foundation. Around 25 signs along the Lahaina bypass were blown away or burned. In Lahaina, the local aquatics center suffered minor damage. A culvert failure near Haiku caused the formation of a sinkhole about 20 ft (6.1 m) deep. Three residences, each with families home, were left isolated. Repair costs associated with the sinkhole reached an estimated $2–2.5 million.

=== Kauaʻi and Oʻahu ===
Torrential precipitation fell across Kauaʻi between August 27 and 28 with a peak accumulation of 34.78 in (883 mm) on Mount Waialeale. Rivers and streams swelled due to heavy rains, especially in the Wainiha and Hanalei Valleys; waters submerged roads and taro patches. In Koloa, a man drowned after jumping into a river to save a dog. Water and debris forced road closures along Kūhiō Highway. Flooding also affected Hanalei Elementary School, prompting early dismissal of students. Gusty winds, reaching 55 mph (89 km/h) in Wainiha, caused power outages. Some of the hardest-hit areas were previously affected by record-breaking flooding in April.

The same rainbands that affected Kauaʻi reached Oʻahu during the morning hours of August 28; rainfall reached 9.81 in (249 mm) in Moanalua. The Kalihi Stream overflowed along the Kamehameha Highway, and the Ala Wai Canal flooded streets in Waikiki. Floodwaters blocked portions of Likelike Highway in Kalihi and Kanehoe. Gusty winds caused minor damage, primarily limited to fallen trees and fences. One home suffered roof damage in Makiki and power outages occurred in Kaimuki. Brush fires ignited on parts of Oʻahu but were not destructive. Prolonged damaging swells from Hurricanes Lane, Olivia, and Norman caused extensive erosion along the north shore of Oʻahu.

== Aftermath ==
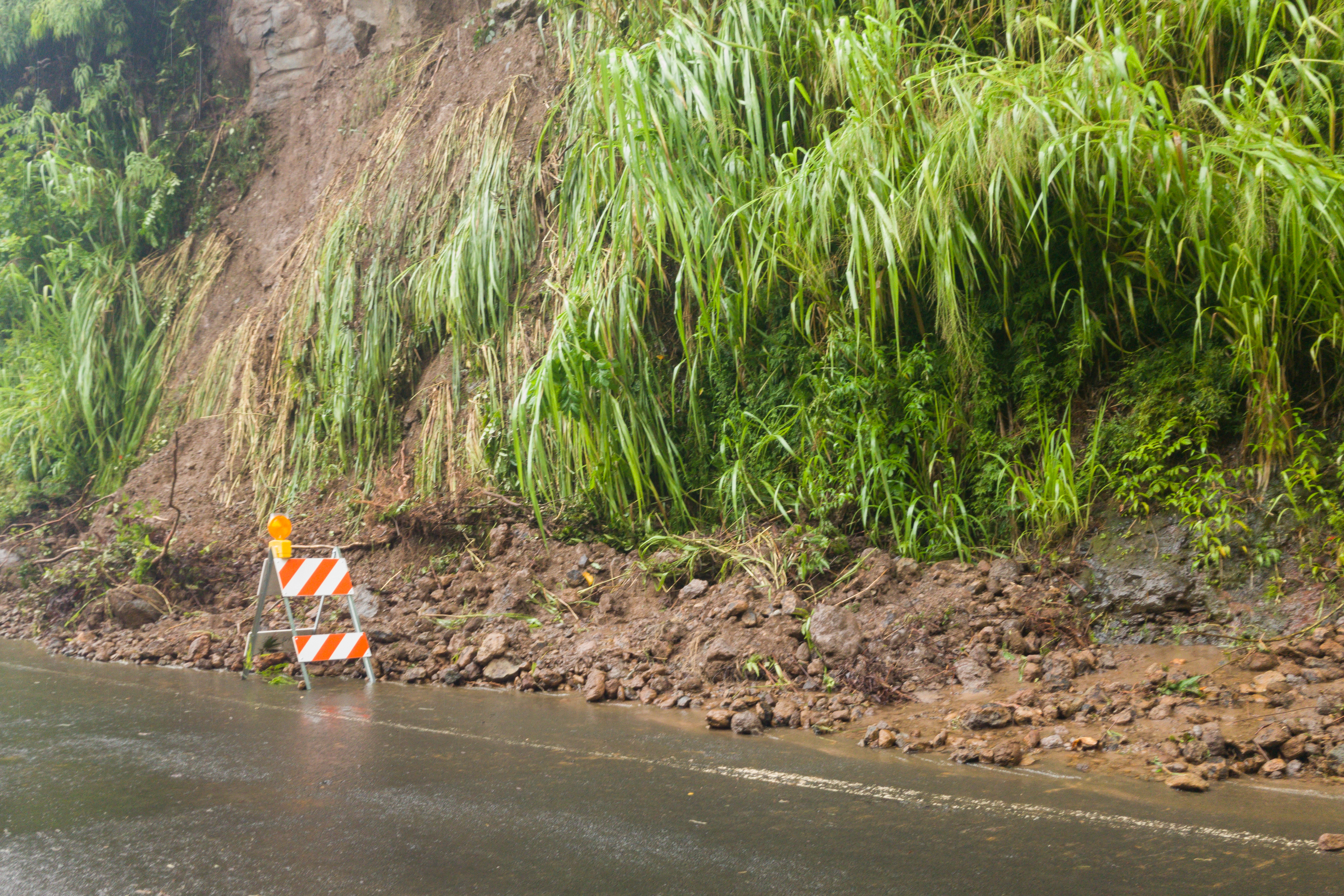
Numerous landslides across the state blocked roads and disrupted travel.

Volunteers from All Hands and Hearts, Team Rubicon, and Southern Baptist Disaster Relief helped residents clean flood damage and remove mold. On August 29, the Central Pacific Bank announced a new disaster loan program that would provide $1,000–10,000 to eligible applicants. Officials advised residents to stay out of coastal waters between Hāmākua Coast and Laupāhoehoe along the Big Island on September 4 due to runoff and sewage spills in Hilo Bay. President Trump signed a disaster declaration on September 27 for all counties except Honolulu, enabling the distribution of federal funding. FEMA ultimately provided roughly $10 million in public assistance. Foodland Hawaii and Western Union provided up to $40,000 to the American Red Cross of Hawaii. Bloodworks Northwest dispatched blood to Hawaii following the storm.

Power restoration was initially complicated by debris-covered roads and burned areas made off-limits. The Maui Electric Company contracted workers from the Hawaiian Electric Company to expedite repairs. Six poles providing electricity to Lahaina needed to be replaced. The Hawaii County Council reallocated $10 million from its budget toward repairing county facilities. Repair costs for damaged roads and bridges across eastern areas of the island reached an estimated $35 million. Five sections of embankments along the Belt Road needed to be reinforced with masonry. One landslide near Papaikou prompted the creation of a mechanically stabilized wall. Crews also stabilized the foundation of the Kapue Bridge. Excessive rainfall runoff damaged drainage systems along Route 200. Rehabilitation of damaged roads was completed in April 2019.

In Maui, the fires proved to be the most damaging consequence of the hurricane. On August 30 the Maui County Federal Credit Union opened disaster relief programs to fire victims in Lahaina. The Maui division of Habitat for Humanity assisted residents with rebuilding homes by purchasing appliances and providing vendor discounts, namely with lumber. Several local businesses donated to the agency. Two restaurant groups, Na Hoaloha ‘Ekolu and Old Lahaina Lu’au, donated $50,0000 and $10,000, respectively; the former group also held a fundraiser on October 13 during which 20 percent of sales from four restaurants would be donated to Habitat for Humanity. A resident of Honokowai organized a Facebook fundraiser that received more than $150,000 in donations. The Office of Hawaiian Affairs approved $35,000 in funds for 20 families—$2,000 each to 11 families and $1,000 each for 9 others. However, none of the aid had been distributed one year after the fires. A benefit concert on October 21 raised $50,000, distributed evenly to ten families who did not have insurance or other means of financial assistance. Of the eleven homes destroyed in Kauaula Valley, only one was rebuilt by August 2019. Other residents remained in the care of relatives or at the Ka Hale A Ke Ola homeless shelter.

The combination of Kīlauea's eruption and Hurricane Lane negatively impacted tourism. Although visitor numbers were up from 2017, continuing a long-term trend, the 1.4 percent increase was the lowest since May 2016. In Maui, hotel occupancy fell 4.1 percent and overall visitor spending fell 2.6 percent during August 2018 compared to August 2017. The island's tourism returned to normal levels by the start of September.

In January 2019, at least 11 people were still homeless on Hawaii's Big Island as a result of Lane. The United States and Hawaii County governments provided $3,075,000 and $1,025,000, respectively, in April 2019 for the repair of the Piʻihonua Levee, which was breached by the storm. A water quality buoy offshore Hilo, which had vanished during the storm, was redeployed in July 2019. The United States Congress allocated $1,195,089.75 to Hawai‘i County on June 11, 2020, for the repair of the Laupahoehoe Gulch Bridge along the Mamalahoa Highway in Hāmākua. Likewise, FEMA granted $2,246,668.50 in aid on November 24, 2020, for the repair of a damaged section of the Old Mamalahoa Highway. Around $1.5 million in FEMA funds were allocated for the repair of the Waianuenue Avenue Bridge. The Hawaii County Department of Public Works announced in September 2021 that it would begin the construction of a temporary bridge over the Makea Stream. The bridge was opened to traffic on January 8, 2022. Repair work for the Kolekole Bridge began in September 2021, and is currently ongoing.

Following Hurricane Lane and several other disasters, the city of Honolulu developed a plan to build a new emergency operations center in anticipation of more severe natural disasters. The project's cost is estimated at $38.6 million and construction is slated to commence in October 2022.

== See also ==
- Other tropical cyclones with the same name
- Timeline of the 2018 Pacific hurricane season
- List of Hawaii hurricanes
- Hurricane Nina (1957) – A hurricane that threatened to make landfall in Kauaʻi, causing significant damage and four deaths, before turning westward out to sea
- Hurricane Dot (1959) – A hurricane that passed south of the Big Island, before curving to the northwest and making landfall in Kauaʻi
- Hurricane Iniki (1992) – A hurricane that became the most costly to hit Hawaii, making landfall in Kauai as a Category 4
- Hurricane Walaka (2018) – Another Category 5 hurricane that formed a month after Lane
- Hurricane Douglas (2020) – A hurricane that passed just north of the Hawaiian Islands two years after Lane
- 2018 Hawaii floods – A flooding event that had affected Hawaii in April
