= Hurricane Guillermo (1997) =

Category 5 Pacific hurricane in 1997

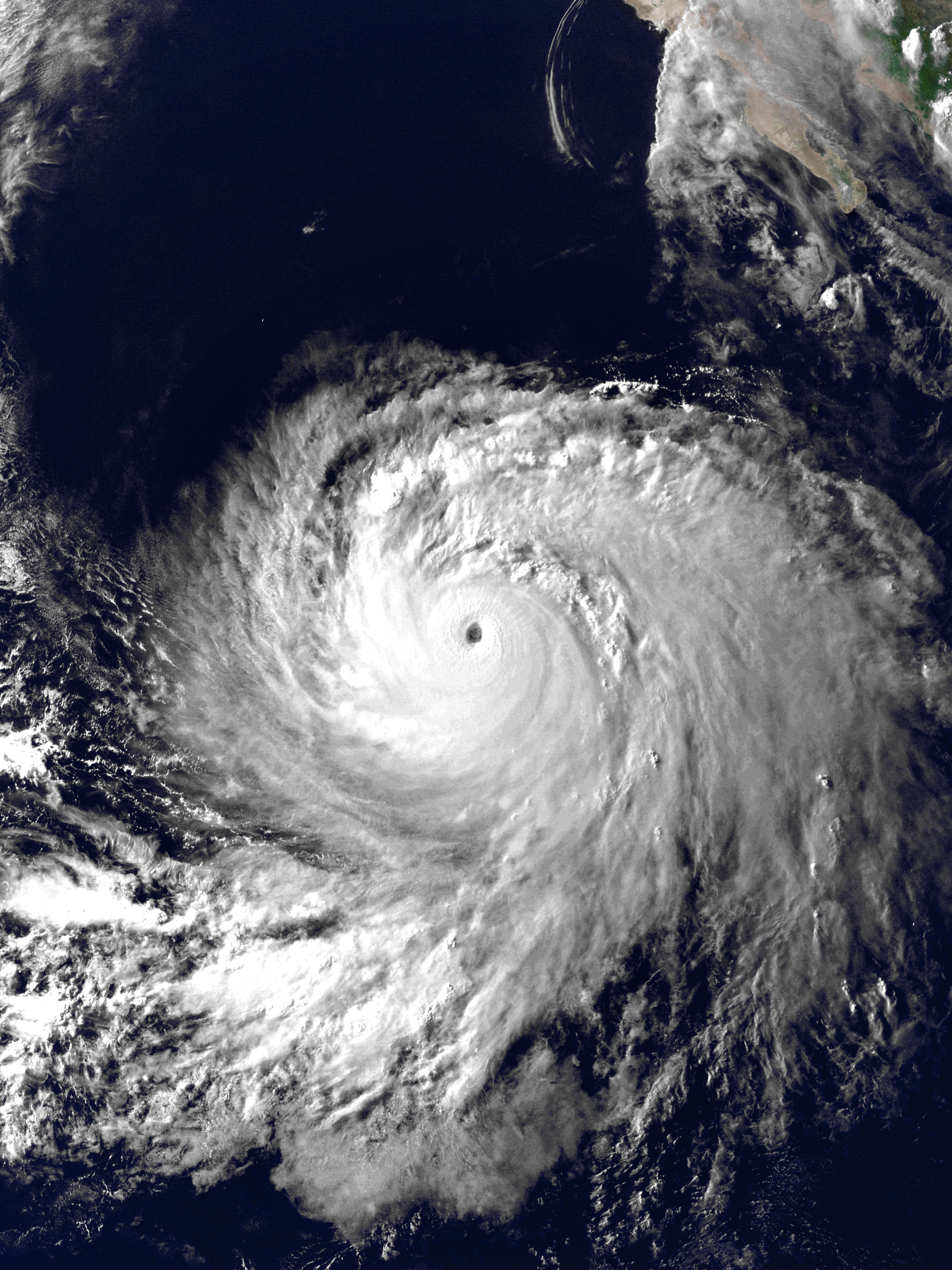
- Guillermo at peak intensity on August 5

Meteorological history
- Formed: July 30, 1997
- Extratropical: August 15, 1997
- Dissipated: August 24, 1997

Category 5 major hurricane
- 1-minute sustained (SSHWS/NWS)
- Highest winds: 160 mph (260 km/h)
- Lowest pressure: 919 mbar (hPa); 27.14 inHg

Overall effects
- Fatalities: 3
- Damage: None
- Areas affected: Mexico, Hawaii, California
- IBTrACS
- Part of the 1997 Pacific hurricane season

Hurricane Guillermo was the tenth-most intense Pacific hurricane on record, attaining peak winds of 160 mph (260 km/h) and a barometric pressure of 919 hPa (27.14 inHg). Forming out of a tropical wave on July 30, 1997, roughly 345 mi (555 km) south of Salina Cruz, Mexico, Guillermo tracked in a steady west-northwestward direction while intensifying. The system reached hurricane status by August 1 before undergoing rapid intensification the following day. At the end of this phase, the storm attained its peak intensity as a powerful Category 5 hurricane. The storm began to weaken during the afternoon of August 5 and was downgraded to a tropical storm on August 8. Once entering the Central Pacific Hurricane Center's area of responsibility, Guillermo briefly weakened to a tropical depression before re-attaining tropical storm status. On August 15, the storm reached an unusually high latitude of 41.8°N before transitioning into an extratropical cyclone. The remnants persisted for more than a week as they tracked towards the northeast and later south and east before being absorbed by a larger extratropical system off the coast of California on August 24.

Throughout Guillermo's lengthy track, the storm never threatened any major landmass, resulting in little impact on land. However, because of its extreme intensity, it produced large swells across the Pacific Ocean, affecting areas from Hawaii to coastal Mexico. Along the American Pacific coast, three people drowned amid high waves, two in Baja California and one in California. At its peak, Guillermo was the second strongest known Pacific hurricane on record; however, it has since been surpassed by seven other storms, including Linda later that year.

== Meteorological history ==
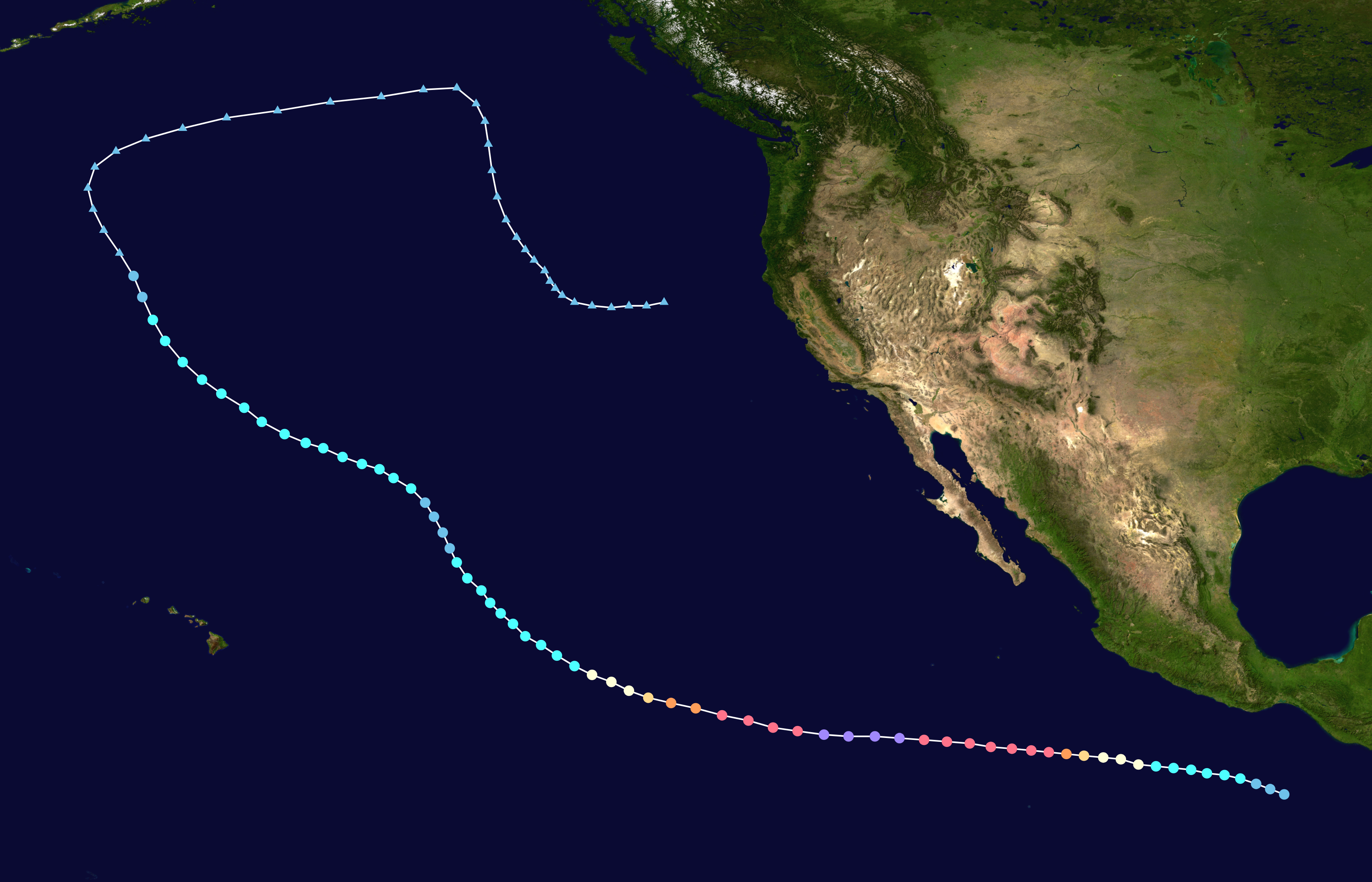
Map plotting the storm's track and intensity, according to the Saffir–Simpson scale Map key Saffir–Simpson scale Tropical depression (≤38 mph, ≤62 km/h) Tropical storm (39–73 mph, 63–118 km/h) Category 1 (74–95 mph, 119–153 km/h) Category 2 (96–110 mph, 154–177 km/h) Category 3 (111–129 mph, 178–208 km/h) Category 4 (130–156 mph, 209–251 km/h) Category 5 (≥157 mph, ≥252 km/h) Unknown Storm type Tropical cyclone Subtropical cyclone Extratropical cyclone, remnant low, tropical disturbance, or monsoon depression

Hurricane Guillermo began its extensive track as a tropical wave that moved off the coast of Africa on July 16, 1997. Initially disorganized and weak, the system tracked westward across the Atlantic Ocean for several weeks. The National Hurricane Center (NHC) stated that they had issues monitoring the system as it moved through the Caribbean; however, they interpreted through satellite data that the wave crossed Central America and entered the Pacific Ocean between July 27 and 28. Once in the Pacific, convection, areas of thunderstorm activity, and banding features began to form. Additionally, a low-pressure system developed within the disturbance by July 29. The following day, the system became sufficiently organized for the NHC to classify it as Tropical Depression Nine-E; at this time the depression was situated roughly 345 mi (555 km) south of Salina Cruz, Mexico. In response to a deep-layer ridge to the north, the depression tracked at a steady pace towards the west-northwest, and this motion persisted through the first week of August. Within a day of being classified, the system intensified into Tropical Storm Guillermo, the seventh named storm of the 1997 season.

By the afternoon of August 1, a strong central dense overcast, an area of high, thick clouds, developed over the center of circulation, prompting the NHC to upgrade the system to a Category 1 hurricane on the Saffir–Simpson Hurricane Scale. Throughout the next day, the system gradually developed an eye within the central dense overcast, leading to further strengthening. Operationally, Guillermo was thought to have briefly leveled out in intensity on August 2; however, in post-storm analysis, the NHC discovered that a steady period of rapid intensification took place. Unlike most hurricanes in the eastern Pacific, Guillermo was investigated by hurricane hunters reconnaissance aircraft during its rapid intensification stage. The aircraft released several dropsondes into the storm to gather meteorological data. This mission marked the first time the hurricane hunters recorded high-resolution wind data from flight level to within several meters of the ocean surface inside the eyewall of a major hurricane.

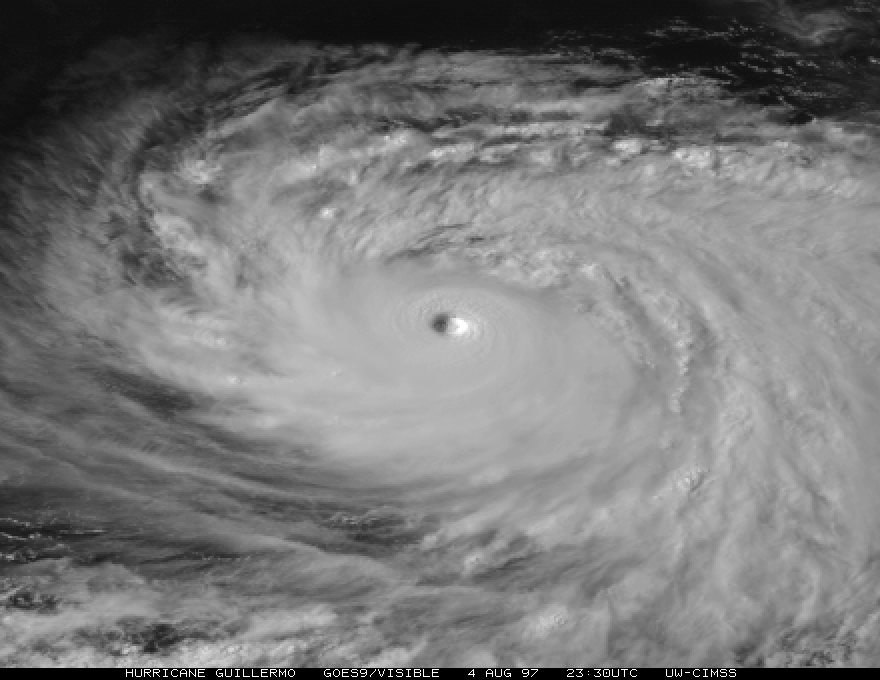
Hurricane Guillermo undergoing rapid intensification on August 4

Radar was also employed to determine the size of the hurricane's eye, stated to be roughly 13 mi (21 km) in diameter, following a 6-mile (9.7 km) decrease due to the strengthening. Light wind shear surrounding the hurricane allowed further strengthening to take place. Late on August 2, the system attained winds of 135 mph (217 km/h), making it a Category 4 storm. During the afternoon of August 3, Guillermo nearly attained Category 5 intensity as it reached its initial peak intensity with winds of 155 mph (249 km/h) along with a barometric pressure estimated at 925 mbar (hPa; 27.32 inHg). A brief period of weakening took place later that day before further strengthening ensued. Late on August 4, Guillermo intensified into a Category 5 hurricane, attaining peak winds of 160 mph (260 km/h). Operational analysis of satellite information indicated a minimum pressure of 921 hPa (27.20 inHg); however, post-storm studies stated that the pressure was more likely around 919 hPa (27.14 inHg).

At its peak, cloud temperatures within the eyewall were estimated to be as low as −79 °C (−110 °F). Using the Dvorak technique, a method used to estimate the intensity of tropical cyclones, a value of 7.6 was obtained. This indicated that maximum winds at the surface could have been as high as 181 mph (291 km/h); however, this was not used as the reported intensity as six- to twelve-hour averages indicated sustained winds around 160 mph (260 km/h). After maintaining this intensity for roughly 18 hours, the system began to weaken as it moved into a less favorable environment with moderate wind shear. Cloud temperatures within the eyewall also began to increase, indicating that the hurricane was losing intensity.

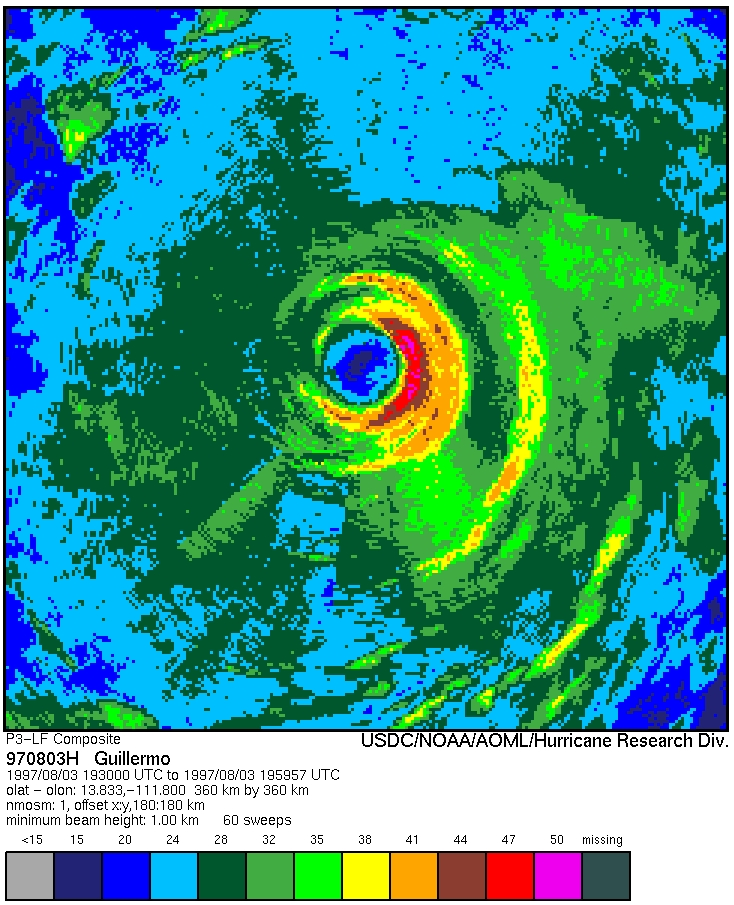
Radar image of Hurricane Guillermo on August 3

Steady weakening took place over the following several days, and the storm dropped below major hurricane status on August 6. By August 8, Guillermo moved over colder waters and was downgraded to a tropical storm as sustained winds dropped below 75 mph (121 km/h). Around this time, the storm started to move along the western edge of the ridge that previously steered it towards the west-northwest, causing Guillermo to turn northwest. On August 9, the storm crossed longitude 140°W, denoting a shift in warning responsibility from the NHC to the Central Pacific Hurricane Center (CPHC). Not long after crossing into the CPHC's area of responsibility, the storm further weakened to a tropical depression as it moved over 24 °C (75 °F) waters.

Although most tropical cyclones generally weaken as they increase in latitude, warm waters of 26 °C (79 °F) allowed Guillermo to re-intensify into a tropical storm on August 11. Gradually, the storm attained winds of 65 mph (105 km/h) before succumbing to cooler waters further north. The storm weakened to a tropical depression once more on August 15, situated well to the north of the Hawaiian islands. Later that day, Guillermo transitioned into an extratropical cyclone at an unusually high latitude of 41.8°N, roughly 850 mi (1,370 km) south-southeast of Unalaska, Alaska. Over the following days, the remnants of the hurricane turned northeastward towards the Pacific coast of North America. On August 19, the system moved within 575 mi (925 km) of Vancouver Island, British Columbia, before Guillermo tracked southward. Over the following few days, the system slowed significantly and turned towards the east. By August 20, moisture from the remnants of Tropical Storm Ignacio were entrained into the eastern portion of Guillermo's circulation. On August 24, Guillermo's remnant low was finally absorbed by a larger extratropical system, while situated roughly 345 mi (555 km) off of the northern California coastline.

== Impact and records ==
Most intense Pacific hurricanes
Rank	Hurricane	Season	Pressure	
Rank	Hurricane	Season	hPa	inHg
1	5 Patricia	2015	872	25.75
2	5 Polo	2026	892	26.34
3	5 Linda	1997	902	26.64
4	5 Rick	2009	906	26.76
5	5 Kenna	2002	913	26.96
6	5 Ava	1973	915	27.02
6	5 Ioke	2006	915	27.02
8	5 Marie	2014	918	27.11
8	4 Odile	2014	918	27.11
10	5 Guillermo	1997	919	27.14
Listing is only for tropical cyclones in the Pacific Ocean north of the equator and east of the International Dateline

Along the Pacific coast of Mexico, 12-foot (3.7 m) surf produced by Hurricane Guillermo affected numerous beaches. From Cabo San Lucas to San José del Cabo, the storm sent waves from the Gulf of California over the grounds of beachside resorts. Tourists were driven off some of Cabo's most popular beaches by the rough ocean conditions which flooded homes situated along the coast. Two sightseers were killed after being swept out to sea.

Due to accurate forecasts, emergency officials across California were able to close off swimming zones and warn the public about dangerous rip currents prior to their arrival. Guillermo generated heavy surf across the beaches of Southern California. Heights from the surf averaged 6 to 8 feet (1.8 to 2.4 m) with local areas reaching above 10 feet (3.0 m), favorable to around 500 surfers at an annual competition at Huntington Beach. According to the Los Angeles Times, some waves reached heights of 15 to 18 ft (4.6 to 5.5 m). Over 100 rescues were reported by local lifeguards. Waves ranging from 6 to 12 feet (1.8 to 3.7 m) also affected Orange County. Hundreds of people were rescued, but rip currents were blamed for three injuries and one death. On August 5, about a mile north of Huntington Beach pier, a 19-year-old man was swept away. His body was recovered several days later. On August 6, a teenage boy and girl were injured on a beach in Corona Del Mar, while an 18-year-old was pulled ashore and sent to the hospital with neck injuries. In Newport Beach, lifeguards made nearly 300 rescues on August 5 and 6 alone.

In addition to coastal impacts, the system brought a surge of warm, moist air into Southern California, bringing temperatures in some areas as high as 110 °F (43 °C). Between August 15 and 17, large waves generated while Guillermo was at peak intensity came ashore in Hawaii. The swells caused no damage and reached heights of 10 feet (3.0 m) in eastern-facing shores of the state.

At the time, Hurricane Guillermo's central pressure of 919 mbar (27.14 inHg) established it as the second-most intense Pacific hurricane on record, behind Hurricane Ava of 1973. However, later in the 1997 season, Hurricane Linda set a new intensity record, and in subsequent years, hurricanes Kenna, Ioke, Rick, Marie, Odile, Patricia, and Polo all achieved lower minimum pressures, leaving Guillermo in tenth place. Guillermo persisted for 16.5 days from its classification as a tropical depression to its transition into an extratropical storm, making it the sixth longest-lasting storm in the basin.

== See also ==
- Other storms of the same name
- List of Category 5 Pacific hurricanes
- List of Pacific hurricanes
- Timeline of the 1997 Pacific hurricane season
