= Hurricane Linda (1997) =

Category 5 Pacific hurricane

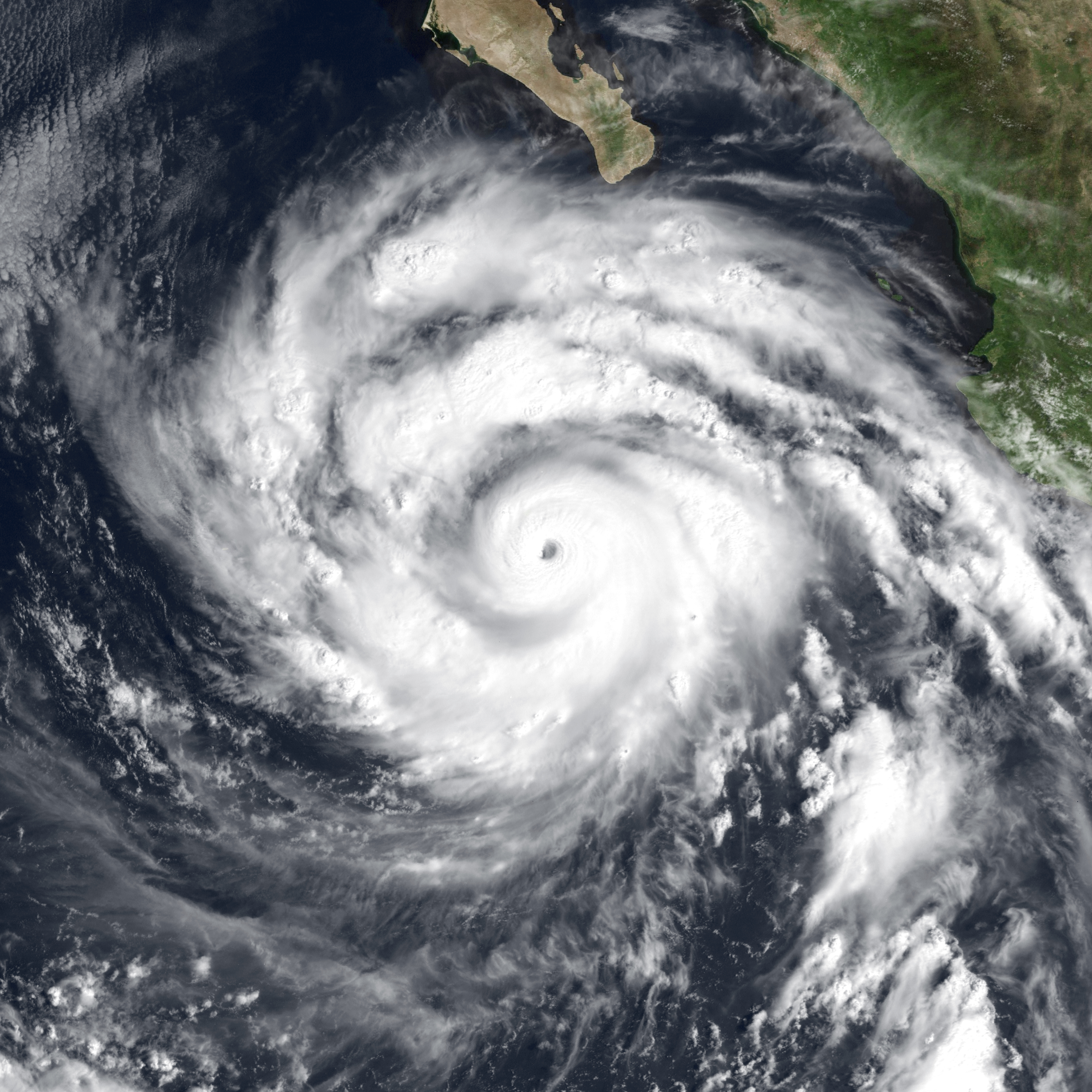
- Linda at peak intensity to the south of Baja California on September 12

Meteorological history
- Formed: September 9, 1997
- Remnant low: September 17, 1997
- Dissipated: September 21, 1997

Category 5 major hurricane
- 1-minute sustained (SSHWS/NWS)
- Highest winds: 185 mph (295 km/h)
- Lowest pressure: 902 mbar (hPa); 26.64 inHg (Third-most intense in Eastern Pacific)

Overall effects
- Fatalities: None
- Damage: $3.2 million (1997 USD)
- Areas affected: Socorro Island, Southwestern Mexico, Southern California
- IBTrACS
- Part of the 1997 Pacific hurricane season

Hurricane Linda was an extremely powerful tropical cyclone that was, at the time, the most intense eastern Pacific hurricane on record, until it was surpassed 18 years later by Patricia. Forming from a tropical wave on September 9, 1997, Linda steadily intensified and reached hurricane status within 36 hours of developing. The storm rapidly intensified, reaching sustained winds of 185 mph (295 km/h) and an estimated central pressure of 902 millibars (26.6 inHg); both were records for the eastern Pacific until Hurricane Patricia surpassed them in 2015. The hurricane was briefly forecast to move toward southern California, but instead, it turned out to sea and lost its status as a tropical cyclone on September 17, before dissipating on September 21. Linda was the fifteenth tropical cyclone, thirteenth named storm, seventh hurricane, and fifth major hurricane of the 1997 Pacific hurricane season. Linda was also the most intense tropical cyclone worldwide in 1997.

While near peak intensity, Hurricane Linda passed near Socorro Island, where it damaged meteorological instruments. The hurricane produced high waves along the southwestern Mexican coastline, forcing the closure of five ports. Though it did not hit California, the hurricane produced light to moderate rainfall across the region, causing mudslides and flooding in the San Gorgonio Wilderness; two houses were destroyed and 77 others were damaged, and damage totaled US$3.2 million.

== Meteorological history ==
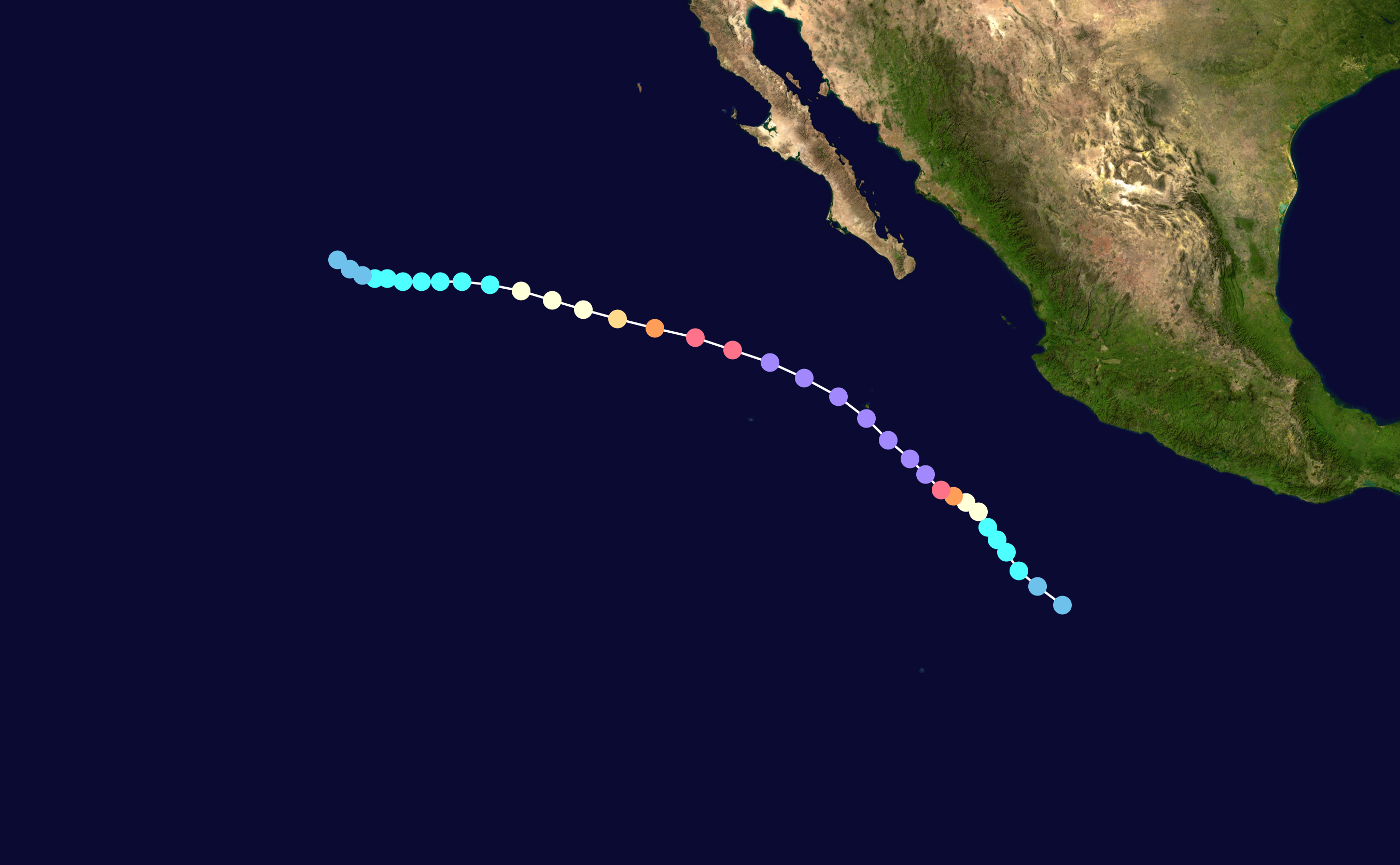
Map plotting the storm's track and intensity, according to the Saffir–Simpson scale Map key Saffir–Simpson scale Tropical depression (≤38 mph, ≤62 km/h) Tropical storm (39–73 mph, 63–118 km/h) Category 1 (74–95 mph, 119–153 km/h) Category 2 (96–110 mph, 154–177 km/h) Category 3 (111–129 mph, 178–208 km/h) Category 4 (130–156 mph, 209–251 km/h) Category 5 (≥157 mph, ≥252 km/h) Unknown Storm type Tropical cyclone Subtropical cyclone Extratropical cyclone, remnant low, tropical disturbance, or monsoon depression

The origins of Hurricane Linda are believed to have been in a tropical wave that moved off the coast of Africa on August 24. The wave tracked westward across the Atlantic Ocean and Caribbean Sea without development. An area of convection developed to the west of Panama in the Pacific Ocean on September 6, which is believed to have been related to the tropical wave. The system continued westward, and within three days of entering the basin, a poorly defined circulation formed. Banding features began to develop, and at around 1200 UTC on September 9, the system organized into Tropical Depression Fourteen-E. At the time, it was approximately 460 miles (740 km) south of the Mexican city of Manzanillo.

On becoming a tropical cyclone, the depression moved northwestward at 6 and 12 miles per hour (9.7 and 19.3 km/h), partially under the influence of a mid- to upper-level low near the southern tip of the Baja California Peninsula. Deep convection and banding features increased, and the depression intensified into a tropical storm early on September 10. Upon being designated, the cyclone was named Linda by the National Hurricane Center (NHC). As upper-level outflow became well-established, the storm began to strengthen quickly. By September 11, an intermittent eye appeared, by which time the NHC estimated that Linda reached hurricane status. The storm began to rapidly intensify; its small eye became well-defined and surrounded by very cold convection. In a 24‑hour period, the minimum pressure dropped 81 millibars (2.4 inHg), or an average drop of 3.38 millibars (0.100 inHg) per hour. Such intensification met the criterion for explosive deepening, an average hourly pressure decrease of at least 2.5 millibars (0.074 inHg). By early September 12, Hurricane Linda reached Category 5 status on the Saffir-Simpson scale, and around 0600 UTC, Linda attained estimated peak winds of 185 mph (298 km/h) about 145 mi (233 km) southeast of Socorro Island. Its maximum sustained winds were estimated between 180 and 195 mph (290 and 314 km/h), based on Dvorak T-numbers of 7.5 and 8.0 respectively, and gusts were estimated to have reached 220 mph (350 km/h). The hurricane's pressure is estimated at 902 millibars (26.6 inHg), making Linda the most intense Pacific hurricane at the time. When the storm was active, its pressure was estimated to have been slightly lower, at 900 millibars (27 inHg).

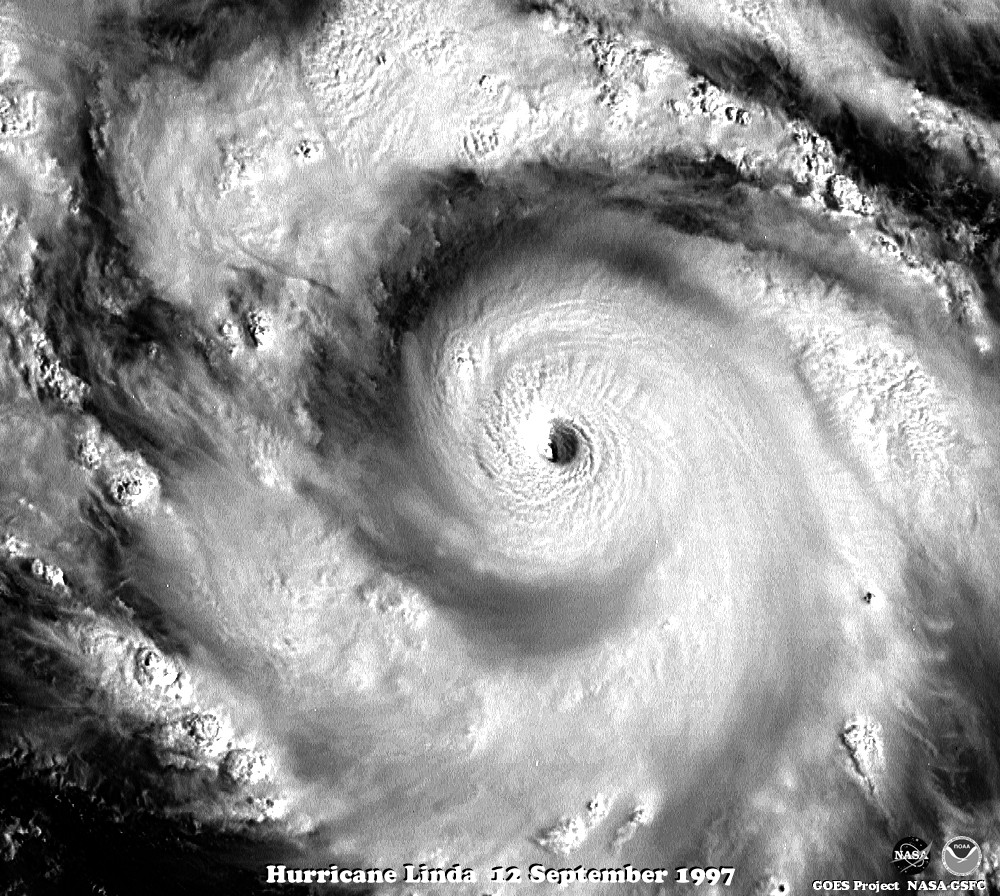
Visible satellite image of Hurricane Linda's eye near peak intensity

Shortly after reaching peak intensity, Hurricane Linda passed near Socorro Island as a Category 5 hurricane. Around that time, tropical cyclone forecast models suggested that the hurricane would turn toward southern California due to an approaching upper-level trough. Had Linda struck the state, it would have been much weaker at that time, possibly moving ashore as a tropical storm. Instead, Hurricane Linda turned west-northwestward away from land in response to a building ridge to the north of the hurricane. Despite remaining away from land, moisture from the storm reached southern California to produce rainfall. On September 14, the Hurricane Hunters and airplanes from National Oceanic and Atmospheric Administration investigated the hurricane to provide better data on the powerful hurricane. Hurricane Linda quickly deteriorated as it tracked toward cooler waters, weakening to tropical storm status on September 15. Two days later, when located about 1,105 miles (1,778 km) west of the southern tip of the Baja California peninsula, it weakened to tropical depression status. Linda no longer met the criteria for a tropical cyclone by September 18, although its remnant circulation persisted for a few more days before dissipating.

Forecasters and computer models did not anticipate how quickly Linda would strengthen; in one advisory, the NHC under-forecast how strong the winds would be in 72 hours by 115 miles per hour (185 km/h). The maximum potential intensity for Linda was 880 millibars (26 inHg), 22 millibars (0.65 inHg) lower than its actual intensity. The 1997 season was affected by the 1997–98 El Niño event, which brought warmer than normal water temperatures and contributed to the high intensity of several storms. Hurricane Linda occurred about a month after the similarly powerful Hurricane Guillermo, which also reached Category 5 status. The passage of Linda cooled the waters in the region, causing Hurricane Nora to weaken when it passed through the area on September 21.

== Preparations and impact ==
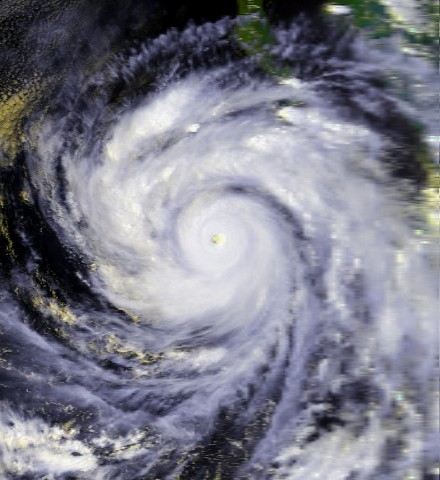
Hurricane Linda near Socorro Island on September 12

Although the eye of Hurricane Linda did not make landfall, the hurricane passed near Socorro Island while near peak intensity. The hurricane cut power to wind and pressure instruments. A station on the island recorded a pressure of 986 millibars (29.1 inHg) before it stopped producing data. No tropical cyclone warnings or watches were issued for the hurricane. However, the threat for high tides and strong winds in Mexico prompted officials to issue coastal flood warnings and to close five ports. Waves of up to 7.8 feet (2.4 m) were reported along the coastline, causing flooding in the states of Michoacán, Jalisco, Nayarit, and Sinaloa.

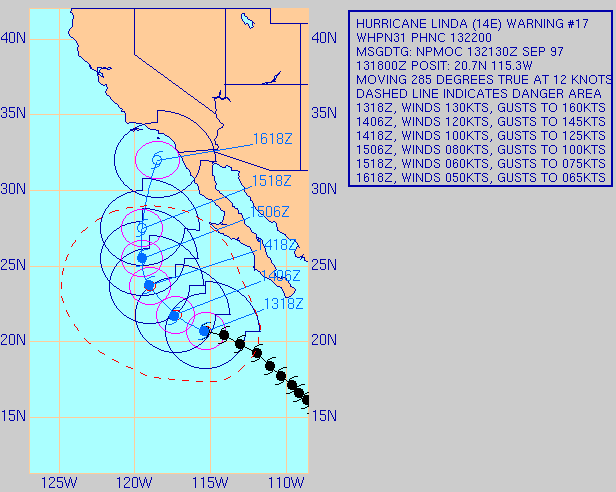
Forecast track of Linda on September 13, showing a track towards Southern California

When Linda was predicted to turn towards the northeast, it was forecast to move ashore in Southern California as a weak tropical storm, which would have made Linda the first to do so since a tropical storm in 1939. The Oxnard, California National Weather Service office issued public information and special weather statements that discussed the possible impact of Linda on southern California. The advisories mentioned forecasting uncertainty, and advised the media not to exaggerate the storm. The office noted a threat for significant rainfall—possibly causing flash flooding—as well as high surf. To prepare for possible flooding, workers cleaned storm drains and prepared sandbags for coastal properties.

Although the storm did not make the turn, 15 and 18 feet (4.6 and 5.5 m) waves reached southern California. In Newport Beach, a wave swept five people off a jetty and carried them 900 feet (270 m) out to sea, although all were rescued by a passing boat. Moisture from the hurricane moved across the state, producing heavy rainfall. A station in Forrest Falls, located within the San Gorgonio Wilderness, recorded rainfall rates of 2.5 inches (64 mm) per hour. The rainfall caused severe flooding and mudslides which destroyed two houses, damaged 77 others, and inflicted $3.2 million in damage (1997 USD). San Diego recorded 0.05 inches (1.3 mm) of rain, the first measurable precipitation in 164 days; this tied the record for the longest duration without rainfall at the station, previously set in 1915 and 1924. Long Beach had a dry spell for 215 days, rain since February 12 to September 14, 1997. Moisture from Linda extended into the Upper Midwest, contributing to a record daily rainfall total of 1.97 inches (50 mm) in Minneapolis, Minnesota.

== Records ==
Most intense Pacific hurricanes
Rank	Hurricane	Season	Pressure	
Rank	Hurricane	Season	hPa	inHg
1	Patricia	2015	872	25.75
2	Polo	2026	892	26.34
3	Linda	1997	902	26.64
4	Rick	2009	906	26.76
5	Kenna	2002	913	26.96
6	Ava	1973	915	27.02
6	Ioke	2006	915	27.02
8	Marie	2014	918	27.11
8	Odile	2014	918	27.11
10	Guillermo	1997	919	27.14
Listing is only for tropical cyclones in the Pacific Ocean north of the equator and east of the International Dateline

With an estimated minimum central pressure of 902 millibars (26.6 inHg), Hurricane Linda became the most intense Pacific hurricane since reliable records began in the 1966 season. Until Hurricane Patricia of 2015, Linda was also believed to have been the strongest since overall records began in the basin in 1949. The previous most intense hurricane was Hurricane Ava in 1973, which had a confirmed minimum pressure of 915 millibars (27.0 inHg). Since no observations recorded the pressure during Linda's peak, its peak intensity was estimated. As such, Ava remained the strongest directly measured hurricane in the basin at the time.

== See also ==
- Other tropical cyclones named Linda
- List of California hurricanes
- List of Pacific hurricanes
- Timeline of the 1997 Pacific hurricane season
