= Hurricane Rick (2009) =

Category 5 Pacific hurricane in 2009

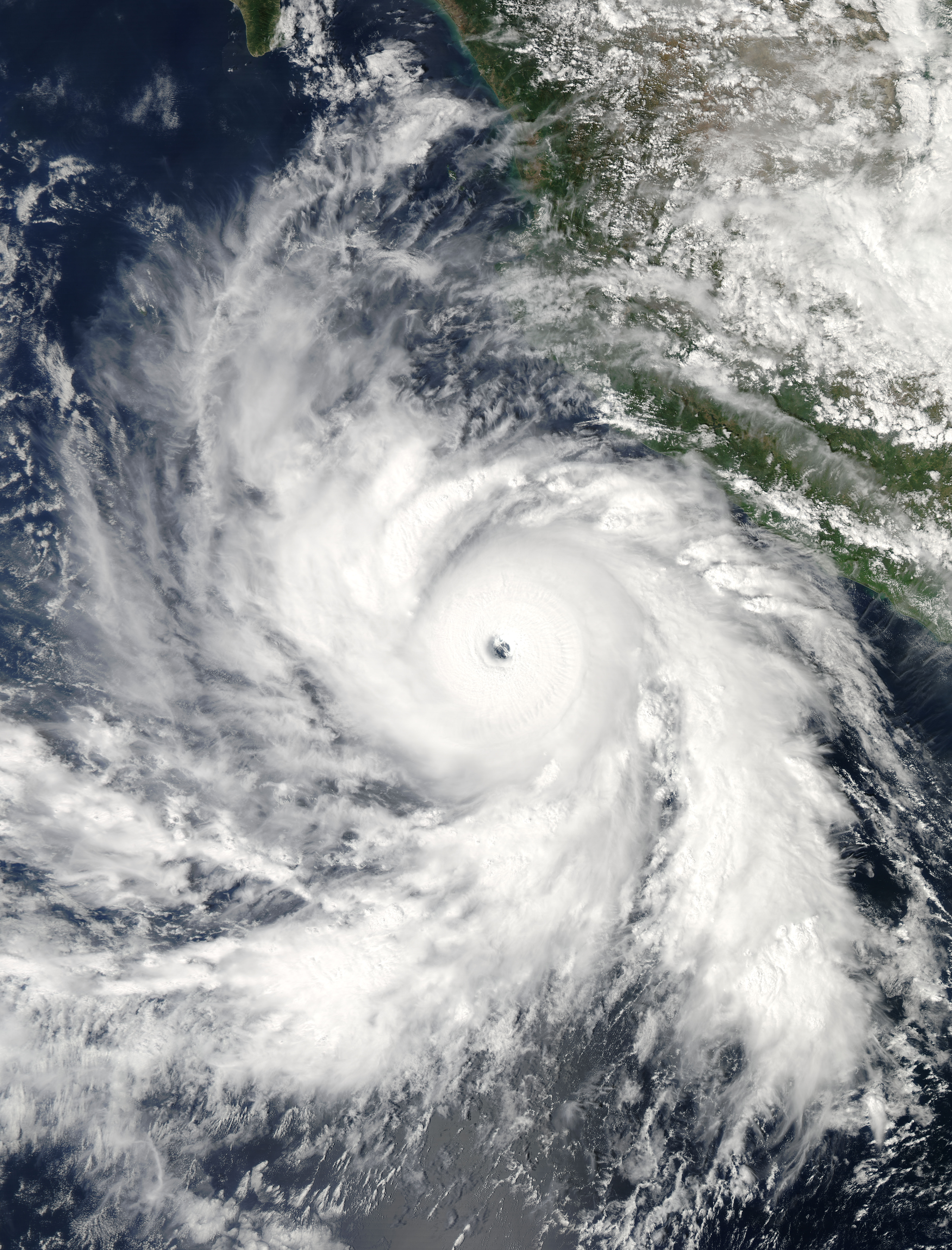
- Hurricane Rick near peak intensity south of Mexico, on October 17

Meteorological history
- Formed: October 15, 2009
- Dissipated: October 21, 2009

Category 5 major hurricane
- 1-minute sustained (SSHWS/NWS)
- Highest winds: 180 mph (285 km/h)
- Lowest pressure: 906 mbar (hPa); 26.75 inHg (Fourth-most intense in Eastern Pacific)

Overall effects
- Fatalities: 3 direct, 1 indirect
- Damage: $14.6 million (2009 USD)
- Areas affected: Michoacán; Oaxaca; Baja California Sur; Sinaloa; Sonora; Durango; Southern United States
- IBTrACS
- Part of the 2009 Pacific hurricane season

Hurricane Rick was the third-strongest Pacific hurricane by maximum sustained winds, tied with Hurricane Polo, and the fourth-most intense by central pressure. Developing off the southern coast of Mexico on October 15, Rick traversed an area with favorable environmental conditions, favoring rapid intensification, allowing it to become a hurricane within 24 hours of being declared a tropical depression. An eye began to form during the afternoon of October 16; once fully formed, the storm underwent another period of rapid strengthening. During the afternoon of October 17, the storm attained Category 5 status on the Saffir–Simpson hurricane wind scale. Several hours later, Rick attained its peak intensity with winds of 180 mph (285 km/h) and a barometric pressure of 906 mbar (hPa; 26.75 inHg).

After maintaining this intensity for several hours, Rick began to weaken in response to a combination of an eyewall replacement cycle and increasing wind shear. By October 19, the storm was downgraded to a Category 3 hurricane and the following day to a tropical storm. The long-anticipated northeast turn took place near the end of this phase, also accompanied by a brief decrease in forward motion. On October 21, Rick quickly moved northeast, brushing the tip of Baja California Sur before making landfall near Mazatlán with winds of 60 mph (97 km/h; 52 kn). Several hours after moving inland, the final advisory from the NHC was issued as the storm weakened to a tropical depression and dissipated.

Prior to landfall, the National Hurricane Center (NHC) initially forecast Rick to make landfall in southern Baja California as a high-end Category 2 hurricane, prompting hurricane watches. Officials ordered several hundred residents to evacuate from low-lying areas, although tropical storm warnings replaced the hurricane watches after the storm had weakened. Overall, the damage from Rick was significantly less than initially anticipated. In Mexico, three people were killed by the storm, one in Oaxaca and two in Baja California Sur.

== Meteorological history ==
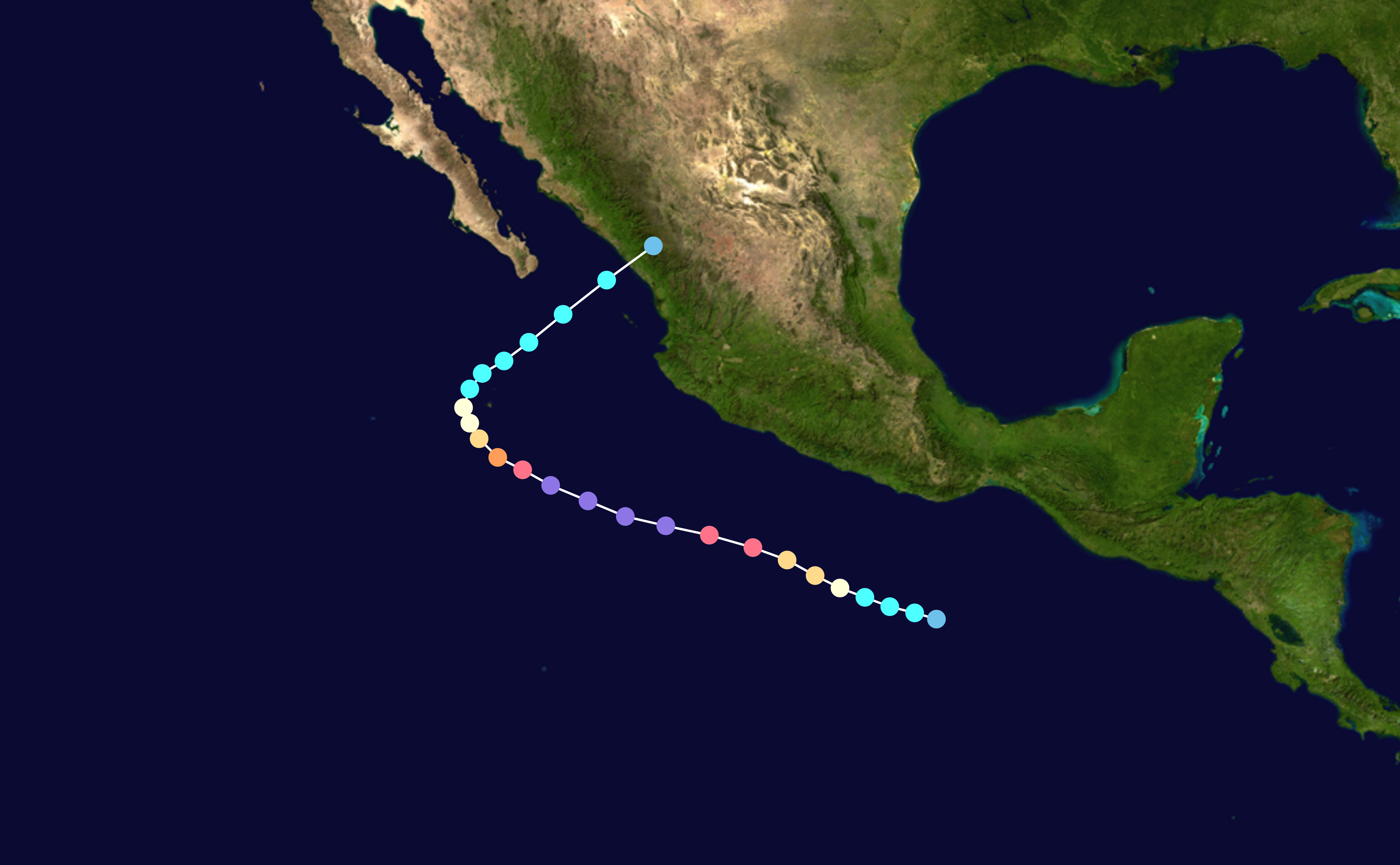
Map plotting the storm's track and intensity, according to the Saffir–Simpson scale Map key Saffir–Simpson scale Tropical depression (≤38 mph, ≤62 km/h) Tropical storm (39–73 mph, 63–118 km/h) Category 1 (74–95 mph, 119–153 km/h) Category 2 (96–110 mph, 154–177 km/h) Category 3 (111–129 mph, 178–208 km/h) Category 4 (130–156 mph, 209–251 km/h) Category 5 (≥157 mph, ≥252 km/h) Unknown Storm type Tropical cyclone Subtropical cyclone Extratropical cyclone, remnant low, tropical disturbance, or monsoon depression

Hurricane Rick originated from a strong tropical wave that moved off the west coast of Africa on October 3, 2009. Convective activity was initially sparse as the system tracked westward across the Atlantic Ocean. By October 8, an area of low pressure developed within the disturbance wave and convection increased. The low eventually moved over South America and dissipated on October 11. The wave, however, remained well-defined and continued westward, entering the Pacific Ocean on October 12. By the morning of October 15, the wave began to regain convection and eventually spawned a new area of low pressure roughly 475 mi (764 km; 413 nmi) south-southwest of Puerto Ángel, Mexico. By the afternoon, the NHC reported that the system had become increasingly organized and was likely to develop into a tropical depression later that day. Around 11:00 am PDT (1800 UTC), the NHC declared that the low had developed into a tropical depression, the 20th of the 2009 Pacific hurricane season. The storm featured well-developed outflow in all directions. Environmental conditions consisting of low wind shear, high moisture content and above average sea surface temperatures in the path of the system were exceptionally favorable for rapid development. Additionally, the storm was being steered through this region by a low- to mid-level ridge over Mexico.

Six hours after being declared a depression, the system quickly intensified into a tropical storm, at which time it was given the name Rick. Deep convection, an early indication of an eye forming, had begun wrapping around the center of the system. Early on October 16, a ragged eyewall began to develop and several hours later, Rick intensified into a Category 1 hurricane with winds of 75 mph (120 km/h). The rapid intensification was fueled by waters of 30 °C (86 °F), several degrees above average. By the evening of October 16, microwave satellite imagery depicted a well-defined eye; however, this feature was not present on infrared images. Despite this, the NHC upgraded Rick to a Category 2 hurricane with winds now reaching 100 mph (160 km/h). Early the next morning, the storm intensified into a major hurricane, a storm that ranks as a Category 3 or higher on the Saffir–Simpson hurricane scale. The eye was clearly visible on satellite images and deep, very cold convection surrounded it, signifying a powerful cyclone. Less than 40 minutes after this upgrade, the NHC issued a special advisory stating that Rick had further strengthened into a Category 4 hurricane.

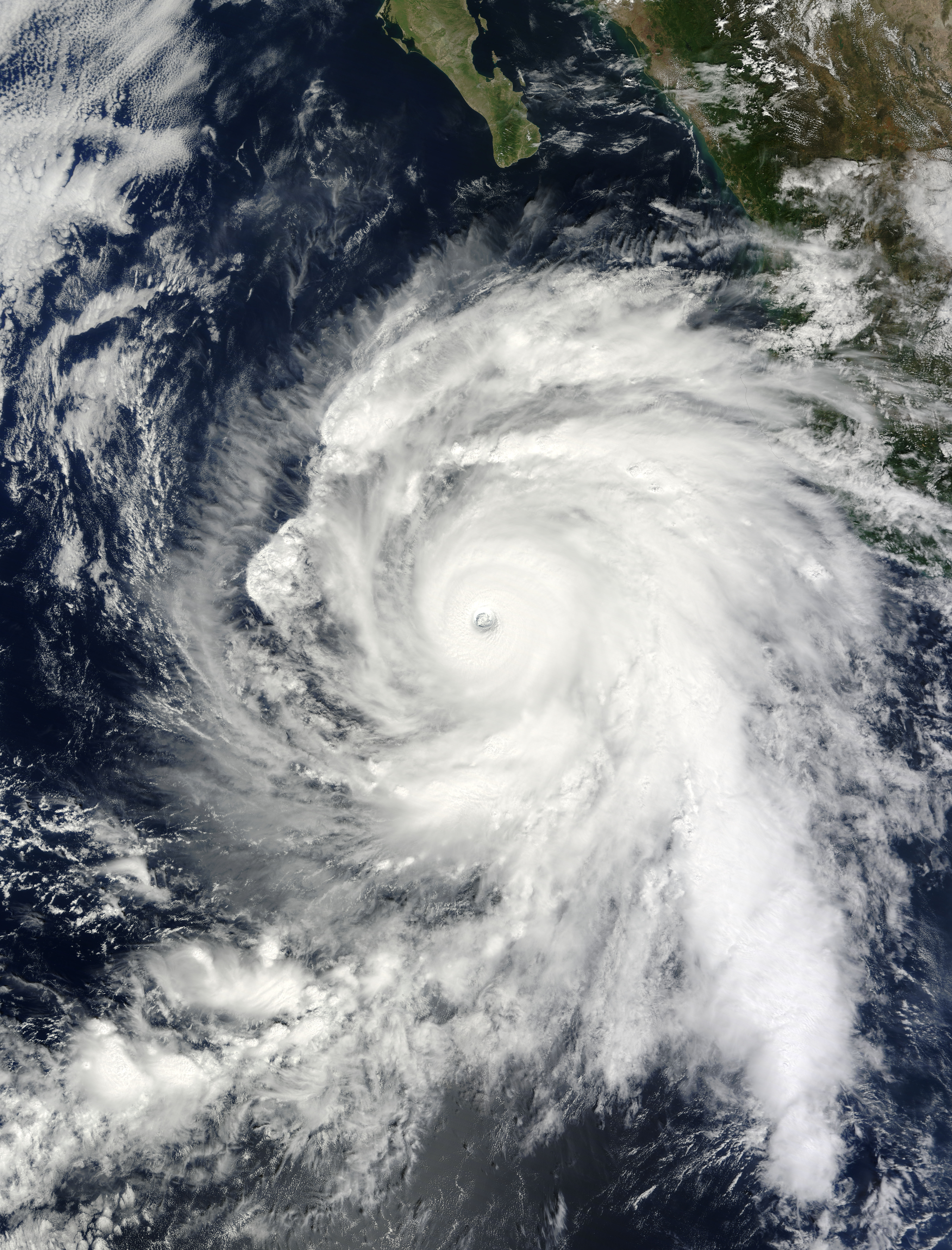
Hurricane Rick after peak intensity, on October 18

Continuing to gain strength, Rick attained winds of 145 mph (235 km/h) several hours later on October 17. A possible outer eyewall, a second eye larger than the first that often forms at the beginning of an eyewall replacement cycle, was noted at this time. The eye of the storm became very well-defined and nearly cloud free, measuring roughly 11.5 mi (18.5 km; 10.0 nmi) in diameter. In addition to the rapid intensification, Rick was also growing in size. By the afternoon hours, tropical storm-force winds extended up to 155 mi (249 km; 135 nmi) from the center of the storm, with a maximum gale diameter of 300 mi (483 km; 261 nmi). At 3:10 pm PDT (2210 UTC), the NHC issued its second special advisory for Rick, this time stating that the storm had become a Category 5 hurricane, the first in the basin since Hurricane Kenna in 2002. Around 8:00 pm PDT (0300 UTC on October 18), Rick attained its peak intensity. Maximum sustained winds in the eyewall reached an estimated 180 mph (285 km/h) and the barometric pressure is estimated to have bottomed out at 906 mbar (906.00 hPa; 26.75 inHg). The pressure was not directly measured by Hurricane Hunter aircraft because the storm was deemed to be too far from land at the time (Hurricane Polo would later receive reconnaissance at a location even further from land). Lixion Avila, a senior hurricane specialist at the NHC, described Rick's satellite presentation at this time as "spectacular."

Rick maintained its peak intensity for roughly two hours between 7:00 pm and 9:00 pm PDT (0200 and 0400 UTC) on October 17, before it began to weaken in response to an eyewall replacement cycle and increasing wind shear. Throughout the day, deep convection around the eye warmed slightly and a combination of dry air and wind shear restrained the extent of the storms' outflow to the west. The combination of these factors imparted steady weakening. Later that day, Rick began to turn towards the northwest as the subtropical ridge north of the system began to weaken. Early on October 19, Rick degraded to a Category 3 hurricane as it began its approach to the southern end of the Baja California peninsula. Wind shear and dry air quickly entered the core of the system, with the eye disappearing from satellite imagery later that morning.

During the evening of October 19, the center of Rick became devoid of convective activity, resulting in the NHC downgrading it to a tropical storm. According to meteorologists at the NHC, the weakening was "...almost as fast as it strengthened several days ago." The first Hurricane Hunter reconnaissance mission into the storm took place during the afternoon of October 20. During the mission, sustained winds of 65 mph (105 km/h; 56 kn) and a surface pressure of 990 mbar (990.00 hPa; 29.23 inHg) were recorded. Several hours after this, convection rapidly increased, with a large area of deep convection developing northeast of the center of circulation; however, this was not associated with intensification. Around 7:00 am PDT (1400 UTC) on October 21. Tropical Storm Rick made landfall near Mazatlán with winds of 60 mph (95 km/h). Following landfall, the storm rapidly weakened to a tropical depression and roughly seven hours after moving inland, the surface circulation of Rick dissipated over the high terrain of Mexico.

== Preparations ==
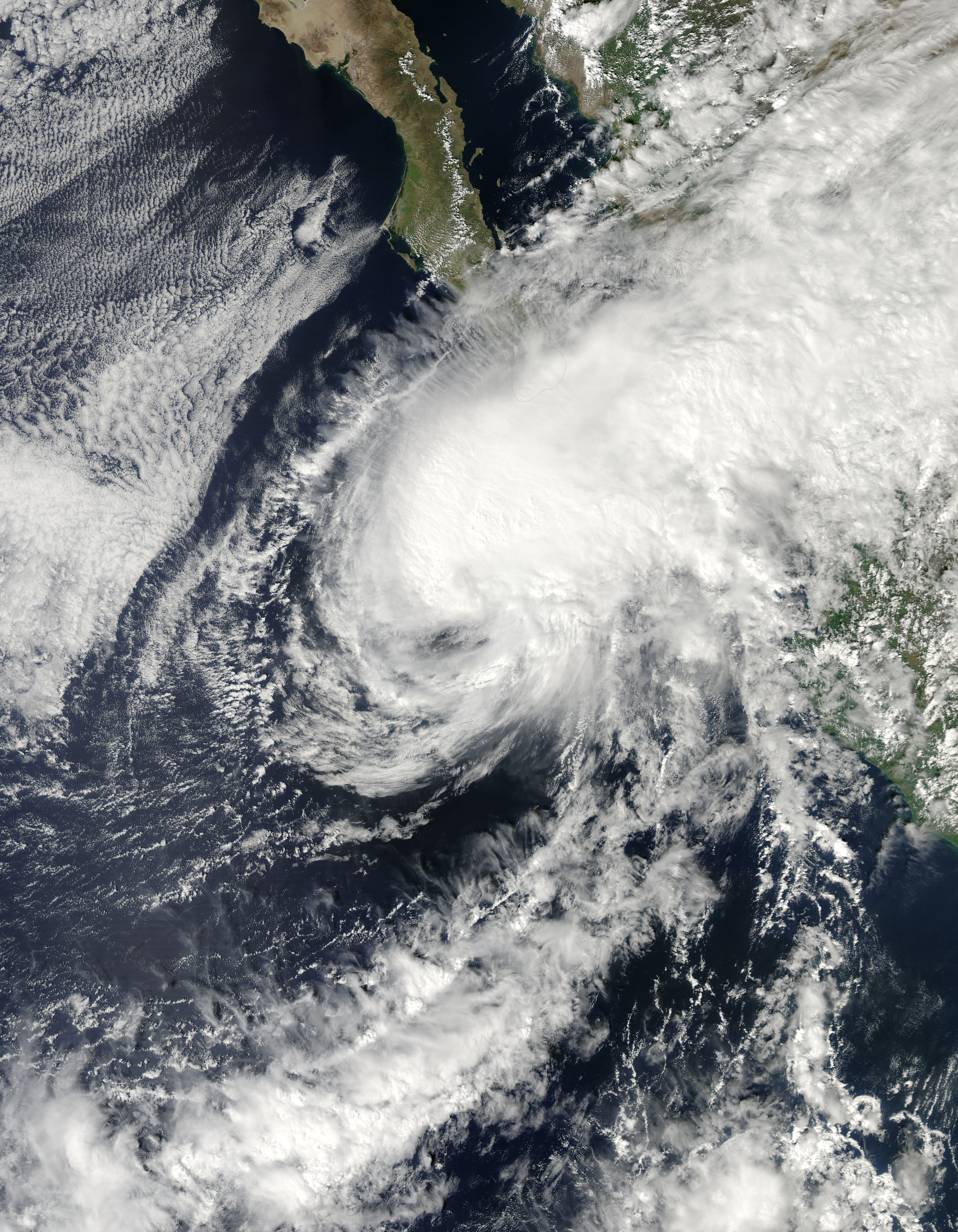
Tropical Storm Rick approaching Mexico on October 20

Officials in Oaxaca shut down beaches and warned people not to venture out into the water. Residents were advised of potentially heavy rainfall. Along coastal areas of Mexico, specifically around Acapulco, officials closed ports to small crafts due to rough seas. Residents around the city were also warned about the possibility of mudslides from heavy rain associated with the cyclone's outer bands. Upon Rick's intensification to a Category 4 hurricane, officials in Mexico raised the alert level in Guerrero, Jalisco and Michoacán to severe. In Sonora, the local government placed 14 municipalities under a blue alert, the pre-storm phase; the alert was upgraded to a yellow alert for the municipalities of Álamos, Benito Juárez, Navojoa, Etchojoa and Huatabampo on October 18.

Early on October 19, the Government of Mexico issued a hurricane watch for areas of Baja California Sur between Santa Fe and San Evaristo. Following the issuance of the watch, authorities in the region began planning to open shelters and begin evacuating residents from low-lying areas. Later that day, the watch was replaced by a tropical storm warning as Rick weakened to a tropical storm. By October 20, a new tropical storm watch was issued for mainland Mexico for areas between El Roblito and Altata. Shortly after, officials had opened nine shelters in the region; however, schools remained open until further notice. Later in the day, the tropical storm warning for Baja California was discontinued while the watch for mainland Mexico was upgraded to a warning. This warning was later discontinued on October 21 as Rick dissipated over the mountains of Mexico. Several cruises were affected by the storm throughout southern Baja California. The Carnival Splendor made a sudden docking as the storm formed and delayed its arrival in Cabo San Lucas by several days. The Carnival Spirit, scheduled to dock in Acapulco on October 21, delayed its arrival until October 22. The Sapphire Princess rescheduled its course, remaining near San Francisco, California, for several additional days instead of traveling south. The Norwegian Star skipped its planned docking in Cabo San Lucas and remained at sea until the passage of Rick. Other cruises affected by the storm include Radiance of the Seas, Mariner of the Seas, MS Veendam and MS Statendam.

== Impact and aftermath ==
=== Mexico ===
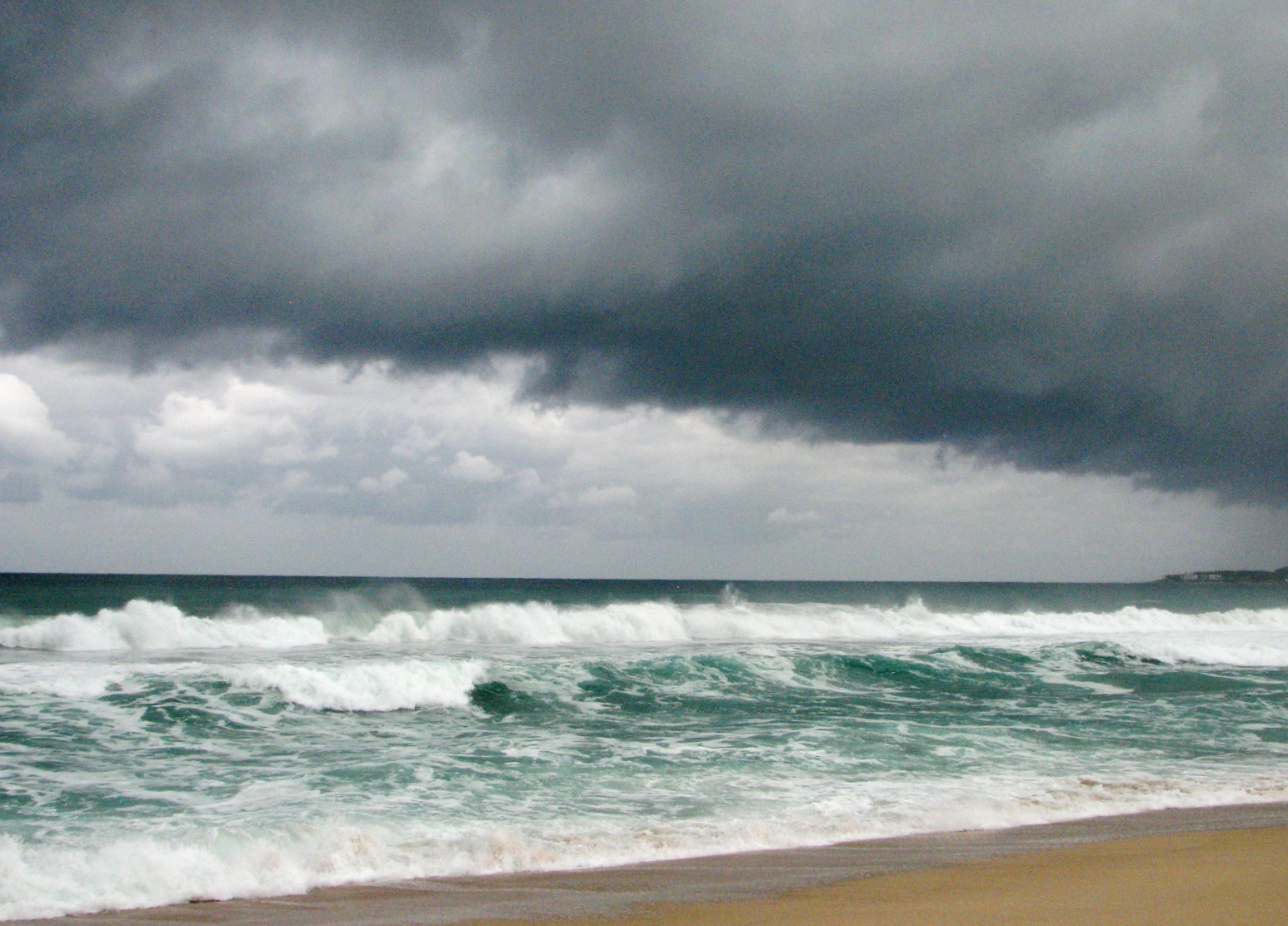
Overcast skies and increased wave action from the hurricane

Schools throughout southern Sinaloa were closed for two days beginning on October 21 due to the arrival of Tropical Storm Rick. Residents in low-lying areas were urged to evacuate due to both storm surge and fresh water flooding from the anticipated 3 to 6 in (76 to 152 mm) of rain. Although several hundred miles from land, wind gusts up to 40 mph (65 km/h) were felt along coastal areas in Mazatlán. Near the coast of Oaxaca, large seas capsized a boat carrying three people. Two of the passengers were rescued; however, the third was found dead. Large swells killed one person along the southern end of Baja California Sur on October 19. Another fatality took place in the same region after a boy was swept away from an eroded beach. Roughly 320 people near Cabo San Lucas were evacuated due to the threat of flooding. Reports near the city also indicated that there was structural damage and significant traffic issues from rain-induced mudslides.

In Mazatlán, near where Rick made landfall, high winds downed trees and signs, leaving numerous residents without power. Heavy rain was also reported during the passage of the storm. Throughout Mexico, damage from Rick amounted to 192 million pesos ($14.6 million USD). On December 29, the Government of Mexico allocated 381 million pesos (US$29.6 million) to assist in recovery from both Hurricanes Jimena and Rick.

=== United States ===
Although no longer a tropical cyclone, remnant moisture from Rick enhanced a strong cold front over the Great Plains of the United States. Severe thunderstorms occurred over parts of the southern states, with at least three tornadoes touching down in Louisiana. Further north, the complex brought heavy rainfall to the northeast and parts of southern Canada. In Louisiana, the storm system spawned seven tornadoes, two of which were ranked as EF-1. One of these tornadoes damaged more than 10 structures, destroyed a grain silo, flipped a tractor trailer and left numerous residents without power. In all, the tornadoes left nearly $1 million in losses and injured one person.

In Texas, the remnants of Rick produced torrential rainfall, peaking at 9.34 in (237 mm) within a concentrated area. Meteorologists did not anticipate the severity of the precipitation in this area. One person was killed after being swept away in her Jeep on a flooded roadway. Several homes were also flooded during the event and an estimated 300 homes were left without power. Following the floods, numerous roads were closed and some schools had delayed openings. Throughout the state, flood damage amounted to $690,000, with most of this being in Travis County. Heavy rainfall in Louisiana contributed to widespread flooding that resulted in the closure of several major highways. In Union Parish, rainfall exceeding 6 in (150 mm) led to flash flooding that inundated several homes and a local school, inflicting over $100,000 in damage.

== Distinctions and intensity forecasts ==
Most intense Pacific hurricanes
Rank	Hurricane	Season	Pressure	
Rank	Hurricane	Season	hPa	inHg
1	Patricia	2015	872	25.75
2	Polo	2026	892	26.34
3	Linda	1997	902	26.64
4	Rick	2009	906	26.76
5	Kenna	2002	913	26.96
6	Ava	1973	915	27.02
6	Ioke	2006	915	27.02
8	Marie	2014	918	27.11
8	Odile	2014	918	27.11
10	Guillermo	1997	919	27.14
Listing is only for tropical cyclones in the Pacific Ocean north of the equator and east of the International Dateline

On October 17, Hurricane Rick was classified a Category 5 hurricane, becoming the first in the eastern Pacific basin since Hurricane Kenna in 2002 and the first east of the International Date Line since Hurricane Ioke in 2006. The storm also became the thirteenth cyclone of this intensity east of the International Date Line since official records in the Eastern Pacific began in 1949. Shortly after being upgraded to Category 5 status, Rick attained its peak intensity with winds of 180 mph (290 km/h; 156 kn) and a barometric pressure of 906 mbar (906.00 hPa; 26.75 inHg), making it the second-strongest hurricane ever recorded in the East Pacific, surpassing Kenna. Only Hurricane Linda of 1997 was stronger than Rick, with minimum pressure of 902 mbar (902 hPa; 26.6 inHg). Hurricane Patricia in 2015 later far surpassed both Rick and Linda, attaining a pressure of 872 mbar (hPa; 25.75 inHg). It also became the second storm in the basin to have sustained winds of 180 mph (290 km/h; 156 kn) or higher, the first being Linda with 185 mph (298 km/h; 161 kn) winds. Patricia surpassed both with 215 mph (346 km/h; 187 kn) winds.

Upon being declared a tropical depression on October 15, computer forecasting models already anticipated the likelihood of rapid intensification due to the unusually favorable environmental conditions ahead of the system. The Hurricane Weather Research and Forecasting model (HWRF) showed the storm attaining a minimum pressure below 900 mbar (hPa; 26.58 inHg), an intensity not attained by any Eastern Pacific hurricane on record at the time. The Statistical Hurricane Intensity Prediction Scheme (SHIPS) rapid intensification index, a storm's probability of intensifying by 35 mph (56 km/h; 30 kn) or more within 24 hours, was set at 60%. This percentage quickly increased to 82% several hours later, 11 times higher than the sample mean. The official forecast from the NHC by their second advisory stated that Rick would become a Category 4 hurricane by October 19; however, they mentioned that due to the favorable environment, the storm could intensify faster than forecast. Once Rick had become a Category 2 storm on October 16, the NHC increased their forecast peak intensity to 145 mph (233 km/h; 126 kn), a mid-range Category 4 hurricane.

The first mention of Rick possibly becoming a Category 5 hurricane was in the seventh discussion released by the NHC on October 17. In their advisory, it was noted that the storm had a 10% chance of reaching this intensity within 36 hours. Several hours after this advisory was released, a special update advisory was issued. This new advisory placed the peak intensity of Rick just below Category 5 status, with maximum winds of 155 mph (249 km/h; 135 kn). It was not until the late morning hours of October 17 that the NHC officially anticipated the storm to attain Category 5 status. Upon attaining winds of 180 mph (290 km/h; 156 kn), Rick was forecast to peak with winds of 185 mph (298 km/h; 161 kn), which would have tied the record (at the time) intensity set by Hurricane Linda.

== See also ==
- Timeline of the 2009 Pacific hurricane season
- List of the most intense tropical cyclones
- Other tropical cyclones named Rick
