= Hurricane Ava =

Category 5 Pacific hurricane in 1973

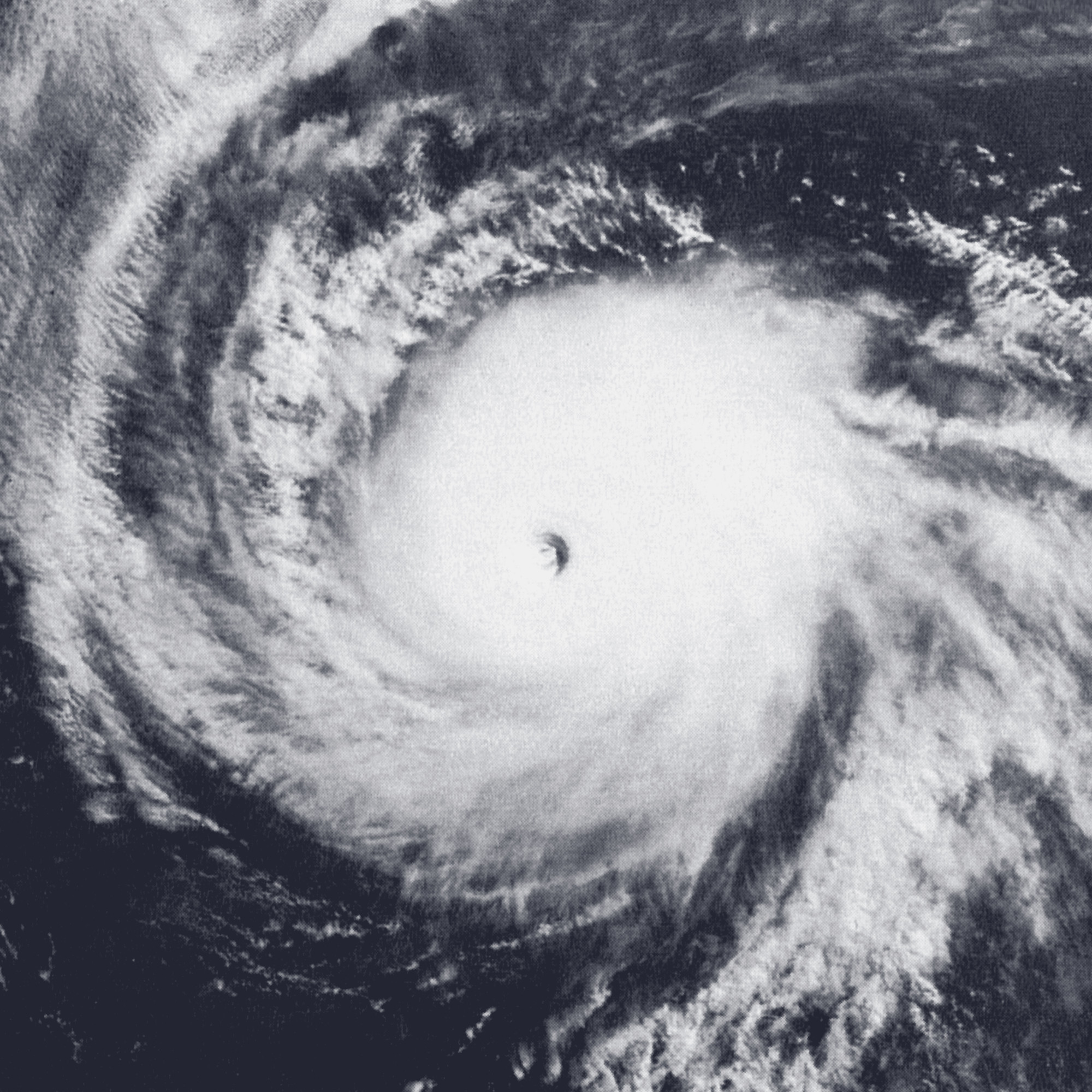
- Ava near peak intensity on June 6

Meteorological history
- Formed: June 2, 1973
- Dissipated: June 12, 1973

Category 5 major hurricane
- 1-minute sustained (SSHWS/NWS)
- Highest winds: 160 mph (260 km/h)
- Lowest pressure: 915 mbar (hPa); 27.02 inHg

Overall effects
- Fatalities: None
- Damage: None
- Areas affected: California
- IBTrACS
- Part of the 1973 Pacific hurricane season

Hurricane Ava was a Category 5 Pacific hurricane in June 1973 that was observed by flight and by satellite. It was the first named storm of the 1973 Pacific hurricane season. Forming in early June, Hurricane Ava eventually reached Category 5 intensity on the Saffir–Simpson hurricane scale, the first Pacific hurricane to do so in June and the earliest ever in a season. Its central pressure made it the most intense known Pacific hurricane at the time.

Ava was given the most advanced measurement and reconnaissance available at the time. Recon flights were conducted and meteorological equipment was tested. The hurricane was also photographed from space by satellites and Skylab astronauts.

== Meteorological history ==
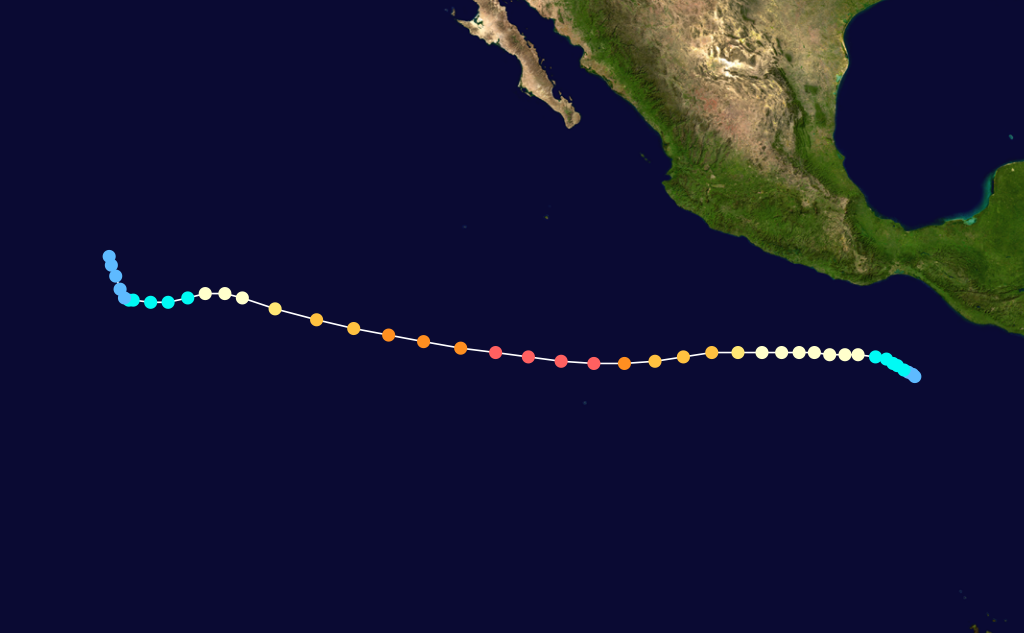
Map plotting the storm's track and intensity, according to the Saffir–Simpson scale Map key Saffir–Simpson scale Tropical depression (≤38 mph, ≤62 km/h) Tropical storm (39–73 mph, 63–118 km/h) Category 1 (74–95 mph, 119–153 km/h) Category 2 (96–110 mph, 154–177 km/h) Category 3 (111–129 mph, 178–208 km/h) Category 4 (130–156 mph, 209–251 km/h) Category 5 (≥157 mph, ≥252 km/h) Unknown Storm type Tropical cyclone Subtropical cyclone Extratropical cyclone, remnant low, tropical disturbance, or monsoon depression

On June 2, 1973, a tropical depression formed about 250 miles (400 km) south of Salina Cruz, Oaxaca. It started out nearly stationary, and became a tropical storm late on the same day it formed, the first named storm of the season. Ava then slowly moved westwards away from Mexico and became a hurricane on June 3. Ava became a major hurricane on the afternoon of June 5. On the next day, a United States Air Force recon flight measured a wind speed of 158 mph (253 km/h) and a central pressure of 915 millibars (27.0 inches of mercury). The 915 millibars (27.0 inches of mercury) observation remained the lowest pressure recorded in a Pacific hurricane until Hurricane Patricia in 2015. It was the first Pacific hurricane penetrated by a Hurricane Hunters aircraft. On June 7, Ava attained maximum sustained winds of 160 mph (260 km/h). These winds made the storm a Category 5 hurricane on the Saffir–Simpson hurricane scale (SSHS), the highest category on the scale.

On June 8, Ava started weakening, as it continued its westward path. It fell below major hurricane status the next day, and to tropical storm status on June 10. Ava deteriorated to tropical depression status on June 11. The system then turned north and dissipated on June 12 as it became embedded in the trade winds.

=== Observation ===
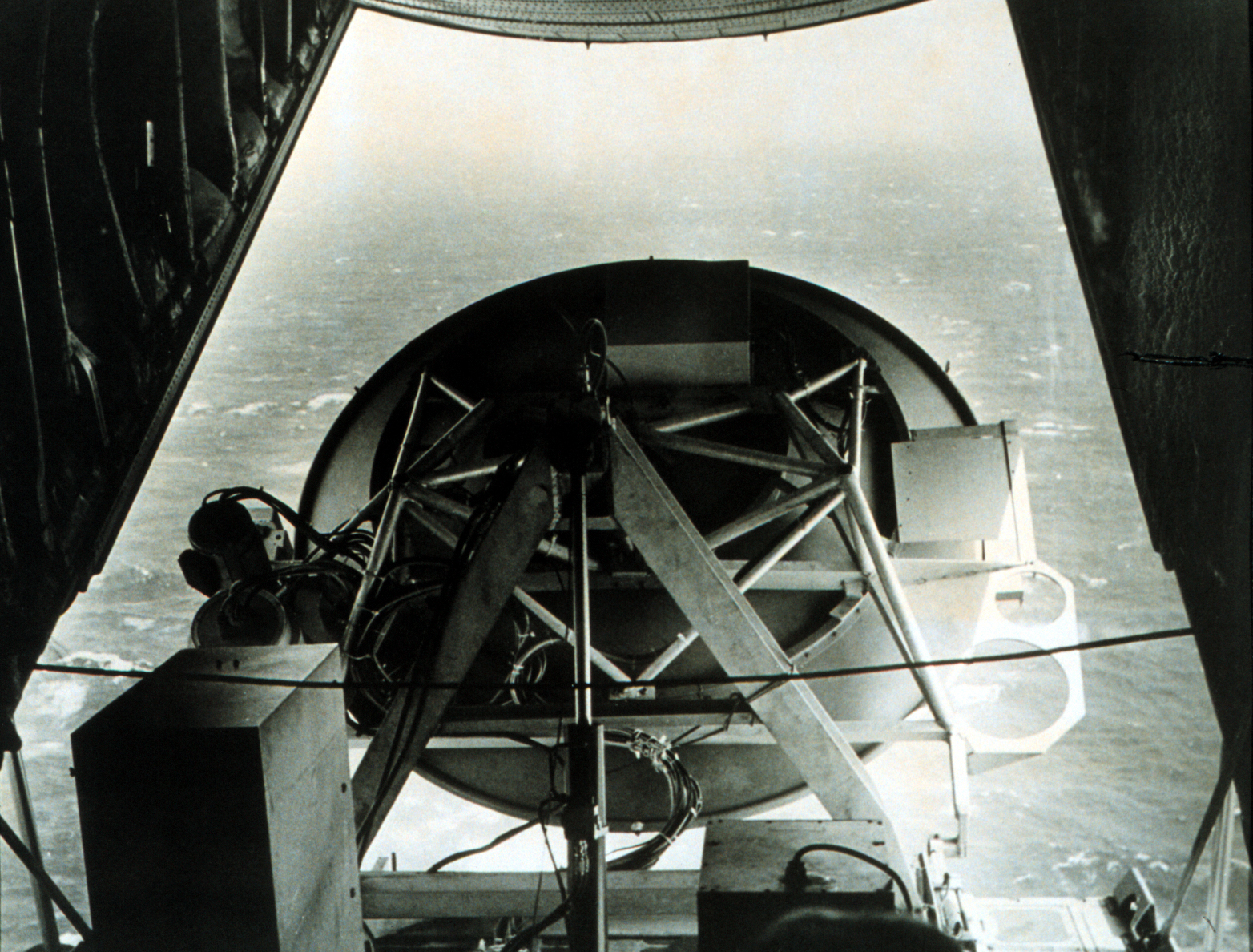
Radar during a recon flight

For a few days, Ava was directly underneath Skylab during its first crewed mission, which used radiometer to measure wave heights of 40 ft (12 m). A recon flight observed similar conditions using radar and laser altimeter. This marked the first occasion for a hurricane's wave height to be measured remotely. The collection of data from both space and the air was done in order to allow comparisons. Skylab also used a scatterometer on the hurricane, but the data was degraded. Pilot Joseph Kerwin described Ava as "an enormous spiral". Ava was also underneath the NOAA-2 and Nimbus 5 weather satellites. NOAA-2 provided photographs that were used to estimate Ava's maximum windspeeds. Nimbus 5 carried an Electrically Scanning Microwave Radiometer and Temperature-Humidity Infrared Radiometer, used to measure rainfall rates and distributions.

== Impact ==
Most intense Pacific hurricanes
Rank	Hurricane	Season	Pressure	
Rank	Hurricane	Season	hPa	inHg
1	Patricia	2015	872	25.75
2	Polo	2026	892	26.34
3	Linda	1997	902	26.64
4	Rick	2009	906	26.76
5	Kenna	2002	913	26.96
6	Ava	1973	915	27.02
6	Ioke	2006	915	27.02
8	Marie	2014	918	27.11
8	Odile	2014	918	27.11
10	Guillermo	1997	919	27.14
Listing is only for tropical cyclones in the Pacific Ocean north of the equator and east of the International Dateline

The hurricane produced hazardous surf and strong riptides along Southern California beaches on June 9 and June 10. Those waves reached heights of up to 9 ft (2.7 m) at Newport Beach, 6 ft (1.8 m) at Long Beach, and 8 ft (2.4 m) at Seal Beach. Those waves resulted in double-to-triple the usual contingent of lifeguards throughout Southern California beaches. At Seal Beach and Newport Beach, lifeguards made 35 and 75 rescues, respectively.

== See also ==
- List of Pacific hurricanes
- Hurricane Linda (1997) – Surpassed the record of most intense Pacific hurricane after Ava
- Hurricane Patricia (2015) – Strongest and most intense Pacific hurricane on record, smashing the record held by both Ava and Linda
