= List of storms named Guillermo =

The name Guillermo has been used for eight tropical cyclones, all in the East Pacific Ocean:

- Hurricane Guillermo (1979) – a Category 1 hurricane that did not affect land.
- Tropical Storm Guillermo (1985) – did not affect land.
- Hurricane Guillermo (1991) – a Category 1 hurricane that did not affect land.
- Hurricane Guillermo (1997) – a Category 5 hurricane that became the second-strongest Pacific hurricane in terms of barometric pressure at the time.
- Tropical Storm Guillermo (2003) – did not affect land.
- Hurricane Guillermo (2009) – a Category 3 hurricane that affected Hawaii.
- Hurricane Guillermo (2015) – a Category 2 hurricane that affected Hawaii and California.
- Tropical Storm Guillermo (2021) – affected the Revillagigedo Islands.

== See also ==
- Cyclone Guillaume (2002) – a similar name that was used in the South-West Indian Ocean.
