= Meteorological history of Hurricane Patricia =

Hurricane Patricia
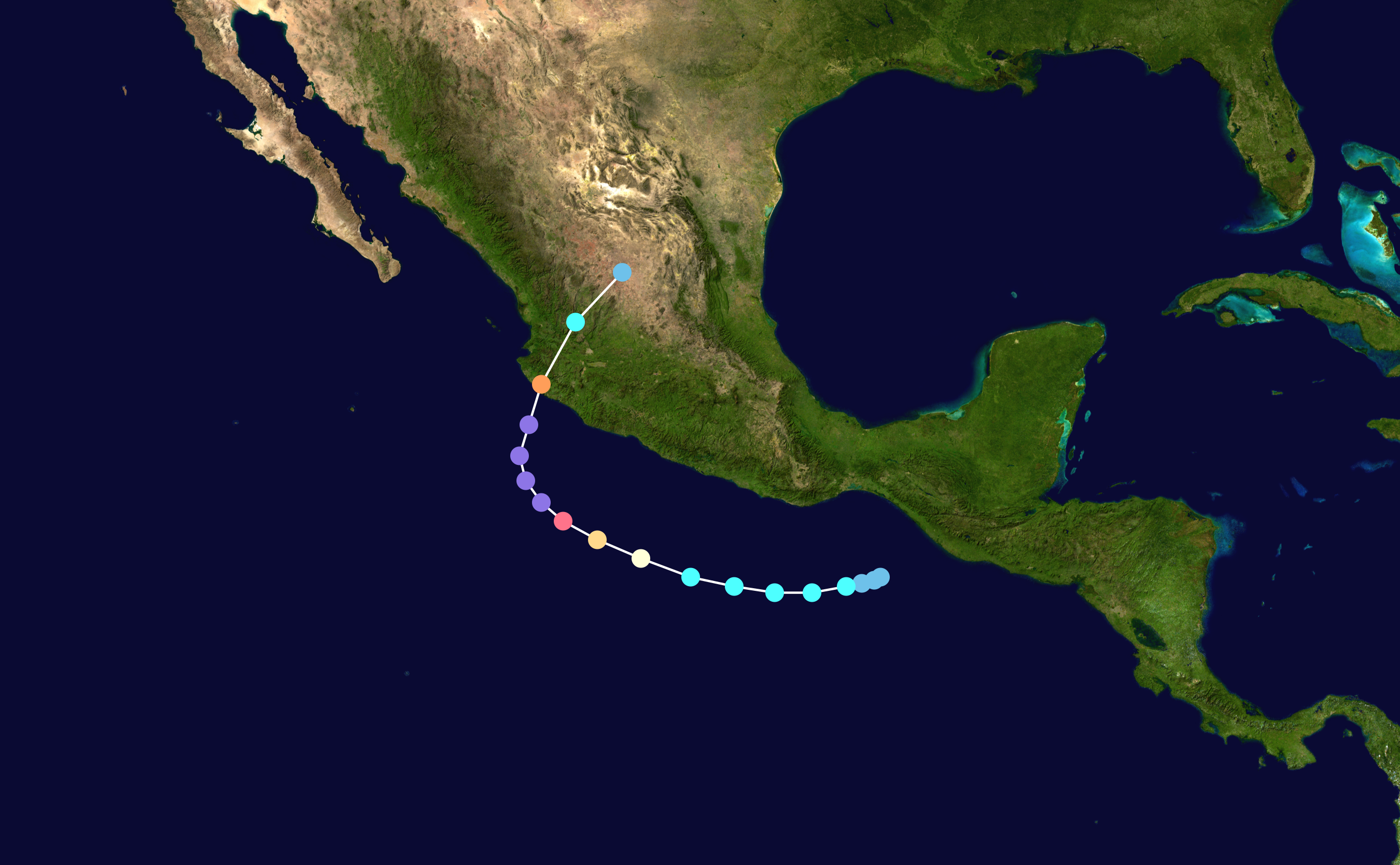
- Track of Hurricane Patricia

Meteorological history
- Formed: October 20, 2015
- Dissipated: October 24, 2015

Category 5 major hurricane
- 1-minute sustained (SSHWS/NWS)
- Highest winds: 215 mph (345 km/h)
- Lowest pressure: 872 mbar (hPa); 25.75 inHg (Record low in Western Hemisphere; second-lowest globally)

Overall effects
- Areas affected: Central America; Mexico; Texas
- Part of the 2015 Pacific hurricane season

Hurricane Patricia was the most intense tropical cyclone ever recorded in the Western Hemisphere and the second-most intense worldwide in terms of barometric pressure. It also featured the highest one-minute maximum sustained winds ever recorded in a tropical cyclone. Originating from a sprawling disturbance near the Gulf of Tehuantepec in mid-October 2015, Patricia was first classified a tropical depression on October 20. Initial development was slow, with only modest strengthening within the first day of its classification. The system later became a tropical storm and was named Patricia, the twenty-fourth named storm of the annual hurricane season. Exceptionally favorable environmental conditions fueled explosive intensification on October 22. A well-defined eye developed within an intense central dense overcast and Patricia grew from a tropical storm to a Category 5 hurricane in just 24 hours—a near-record pace. The magnitude of intensification was poorly forecast and both forecast models and meteorologists suffered from record-high prediction errors.

On October 23, two Hurricane Hunter missions both revealed the storm to have acquired maximum sustained winds of 205 mph (335 km/h) and a pressure of 879 mbar (hPa; 25.96 inHg). Since the peak intensity was assessed to have occurred between the missions, the National Hurricane Center ultimately estimated Patricia to have acquired winds of 215 mph (345 km/h) and pressure of 872 mbar (hPa; 25.75 inHg). This ranked it just below Typhoon Tip of 1979 as the most intense tropical cyclone on record. Patricia's exceptional intensity prompted the retirement of its name in April 2016. Late on October 23, Patricia made landfall in a significantly weakened state near Cuixmala, Jalisco. Despite weakening greatly, it was the strongest recorded landfalling Pacific hurricane with winds estimated at 150 mph (240 km/h), until it was surpassed by Hurricane Otis in 2023. Interaction with the mountainous terrain of Mexico induced dramatic weakening, faster than the storm had intensified. Within 24 hours of moving ashore, Patricia degraded into a tropical depression and dissipated soon thereafter late on October 24.

== Origins ==
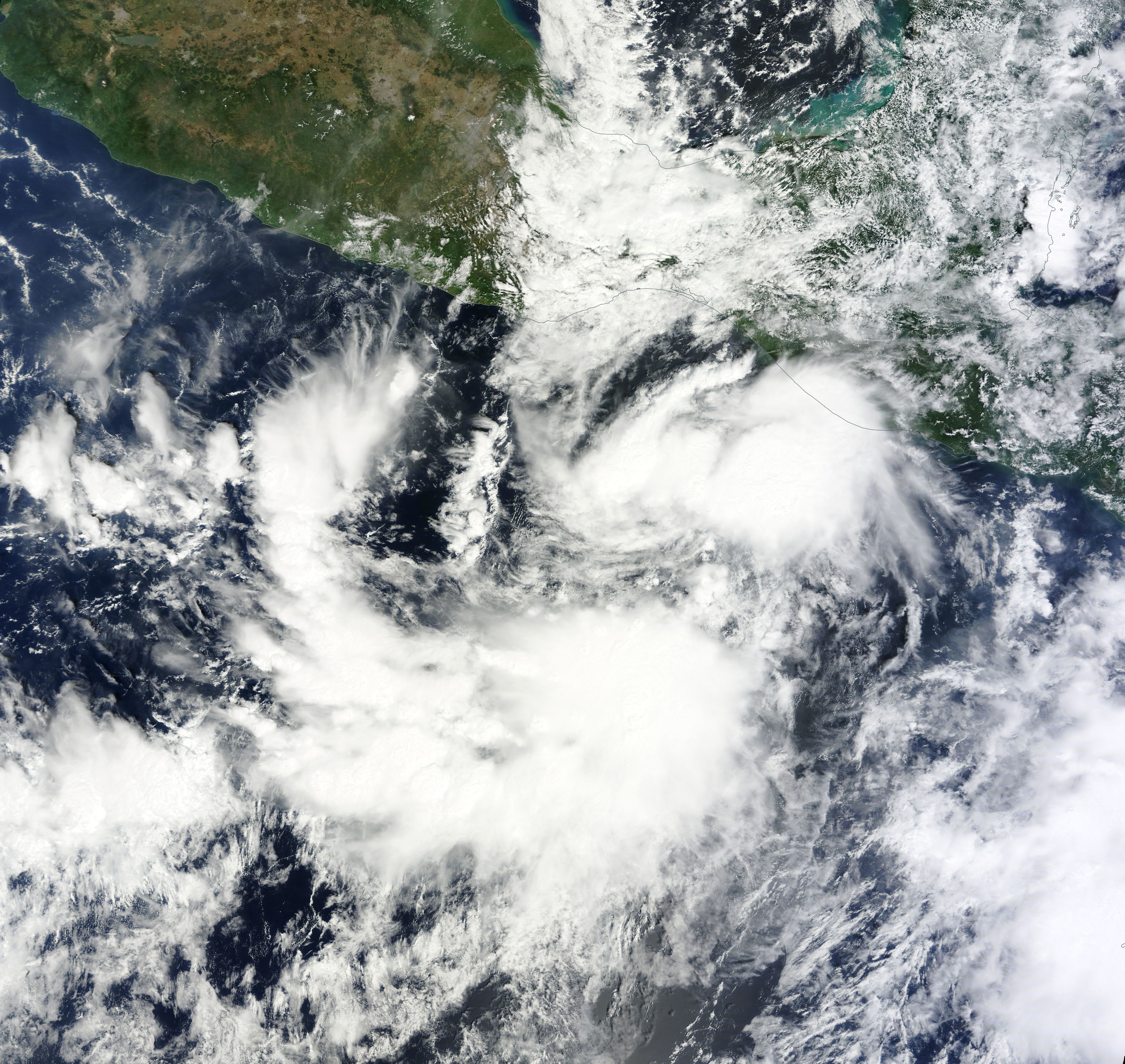
Patricia as a tropical depression on October 20

On October 11, 2015, an area of disturbed weather traversed Central America and emerged over the eastern Pacific Ocean. The disturbance moved slowly over the next few days, and coalesced into a Central American gyre—a broad monsoonal circulation. A tropical wave crossed the Caribbean and eventually reached Central America on October 15; the two systems merged the following day near the Gulf of Tehuantepec. A concurrent Tehuantepec gap wind event on the western side of the gyre, complemented by anticyclonic flow behind a cold front, enhanced vorticity and spurred the formation of an elongated area of low pressure on October 17. The broad system spanned several hundred miles from the Yucatán Peninsula into the eastern Pacific. A large, disorganized area of convection—showers and thunderstorms—accompanied the system, increasing in coverage substantially throughout the day. A strong pulse in the Madden–Julian oscillation—a propagating climate pattern associated with increased tropical cyclogenesis—may have aided in creating favorable conditions for further development.

Moving south of the Gulf of Tehuantepec on October 18, the system consolidated and developed a small, defined circulation. Associated convection became more concentrated around its center. Another gap wind event soon impacted the system, temporarily delaying development of the disturbance into a tropical depression. The low soon relocated to the northeast, aligning itself east of the gap wind event which aided in development. A small, well-defined circulation formed by early on October 20 within a broader cyclonic circulation. With increasing deep convection, the system is estimated to have become a tropical depression, assigned the identifier Twenty-E, by 06:00 UTC. Upon its designation, the depression was situated roughly 205 mi (330 km) south-southeast of Salina Cruz, Mexico.

== Rapid intensification ==
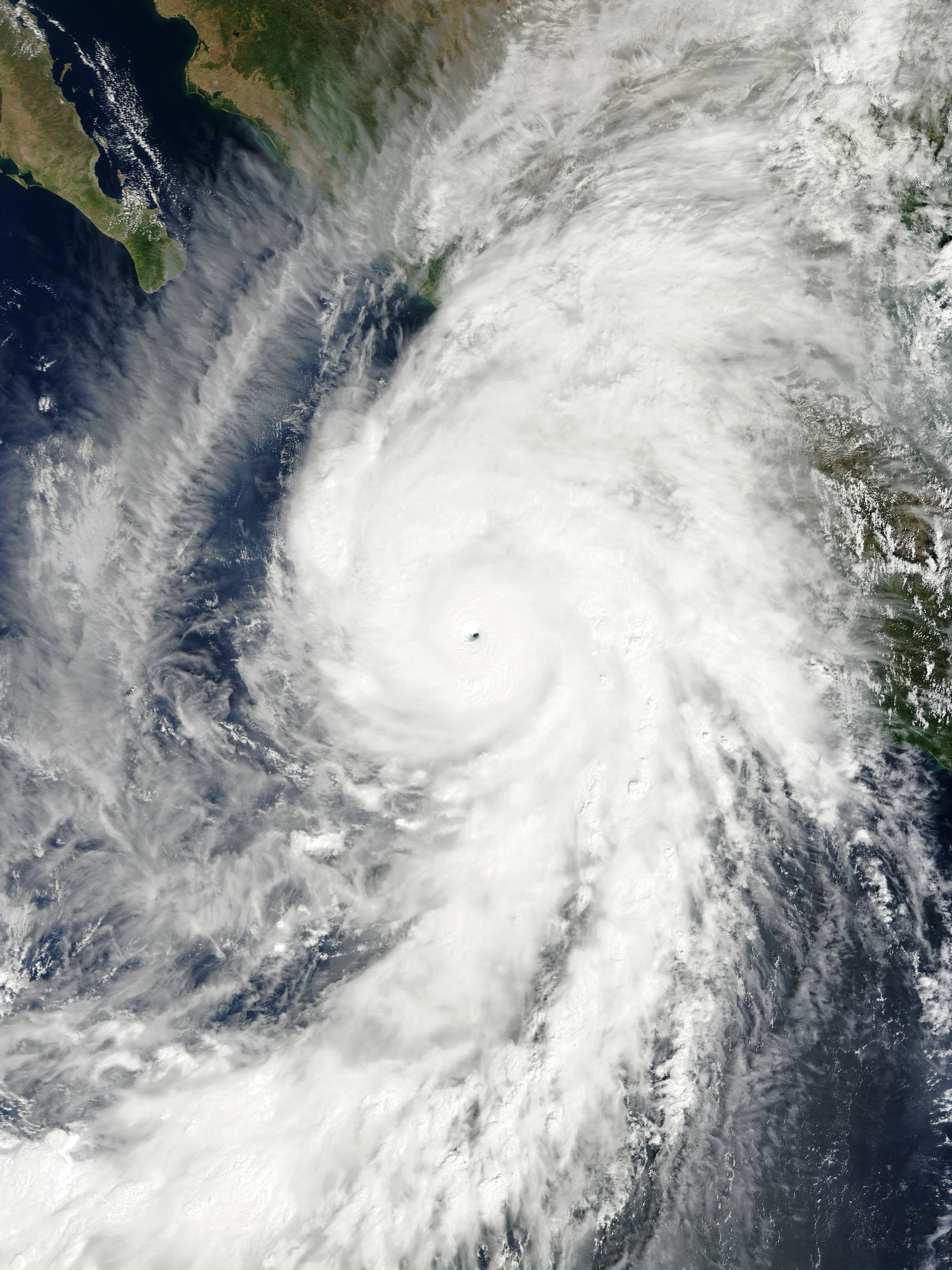
Hurricane Patricia shortly after its record peak intensity on October 23

Located south of a mid-level ridge and the continuing gap wind event, the nascent depression moved slowly west-southwest on October 20. Initial environmental conditions were modestly favorable, allowing for steady intensification. The depression achieved tropical storm status by 00:00 UTC on October 21; the National Hurricane Center (NHC) assigned it the name Patricia accordingly. Throughout much of October 21, Patricia moved through a region of drier, more stable air and over relatively cool sea surface temperatures. Both of these factors served to delay intensification of the cyclone. The system unraveled substantially, with banding features dissipating and the low-level circulation becoming poorly defined. Once clear of the hindering factors, convection blossomed over Patricia late on October 21 and a central dense overcast formed over the center. Simultaneously, the storm accelerated west-northwest.

Exceptionally favorable atmospheric conditions, consisting of little wind shear, anomalously high sea surface temperatures of 87 to 88 °F (30.5 to 31 °C), (Note: These sea surface temperatures were at record levels for mid-October in the region and were largely undisturbed since Hurricane Carlos in June.) and high moisture levels yielded an environment highly conducive to rapid intensification. Consequently, Patricia commenced explosive intensification late on October 21. Patricia reached hurricane strength shortly after 00:00 UTC on October 22, featuring prominent outflow, well-defined banding features, and a developing eye. Upon becoming a hurricane, Patricia was located 230 mi (370 km) south of Acapulco, Mexico. In the following 12 hours, a well-defined 12 mi (19 km) wide eye formed within a ring of intense convection—with cloud tops of −80 to −90 °C (−112 to −130 °F)—forming "an almost perfectly symmetric [central dense overcast]". Data from NOAA Hurricane Hunters investigating the cyclone indicated Patricia to have reached Category 4 status on the Saffir–Simpson hurricane wind scale by 18:00 UTC; maximum sustained winds were estimated at 130 mph (215 km/h) alongside a barometric pressure of 957 mbar (hPa; 28.26 inHg) at this time.

=== Forecast errors ===
NHC forecast intensity errors for Patricia versus five-year running average
Forecast period	Patricia errors			2010–14 errors		
Forecast period	kn	mph	km/h	kn	mph	km/h
12 hours	22.7	26.1	42.0	5.9	6.8	10.9
24 hours	35.0	40.3	64.8	9.8	11.3	18.1
36 hours	47.7	58.9	88.3	12.5	14.4	23.2
48 hours	57.8	66.5	107.0	14.0	16.1	25.9
72 hours	55.0	63.3	101.9	15.5	17.8	28.7
96 hours	25.0	28.8	46.3	16.3	18.8	30.2

The rapid intensification of Patricia was well-anticipated but poorly forecast. Meteorologists at the NHC indicated the possibility of such in the system's first advisory as a tropical depression. They noted the only inhibiting factor would be how quickly the storm could organize an inner core. Just before the onset of rapid intensification, the agency was unable to utilize the Statistical Hurricane Intensity Prediction Scheme rapid intensification guidance due to technical errors. This likely contributed to even greater errors in the agency's forecast. Initial forecasts were consistently conservative with intensity and dramatic strengthening was not explicitly shown until rapid intensification was already underway.

At 03:00 UTC on October 22, the NHC forecast Patricia to achieve major hurricane status in 36 hours; less than 15 hours later, the system exceeded their forecast peak. Strengthening into a Category 5 hurricane was not forecast at all until Patricia had already reached such intensity, although in the intermediate advisory immediately before Patricia's upgrade to Category 5, the NHC noted that "Patricia could become a category 5 hurricane overnight", and in the preceding tropical weather discussion, noted that "Patricia could ... reach Category 5 intensity". This trend continued throughout the rapid intensification period, resulting in some of the largest errors on record through 48 hours; they were the worst-ever for the Eastern Pacific since the NHC took over operations for the basin in 1988. All forecast models saw enormous errors, most of which performed worse than the official NHC forecasts. No model accurately prognosticated the magnitude nor rate of the intensification. The EMXI—an output from the European Centre for Medium-Range Weather Forecasts—saw the largest average error with 98.5 mph (158.5 km/h) at 48 hours.

== Peak strength ==
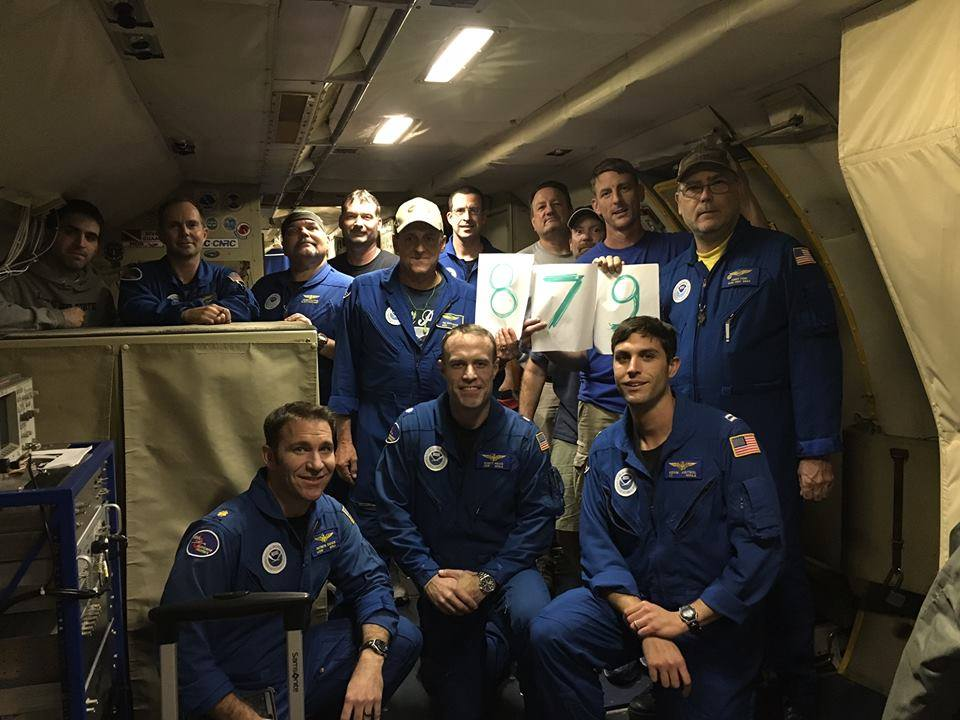
The flight crew of NOAA43 commemorate the record observation of 879 mbar (hPa; 25.96 inHg) after their final mission into Hurricane Patricia on October 23. (Note: Post-storm reanalysis concluded that Patricia's peak intensity occurred between the reconnaissance flights, and thus the actual minimum pressure at peak intensity was estimated at 872 mbar (hPa; 25.75 inHg). However, this measured value of 879 mbar (hPa; 25.96 inHg)—extrapolated from a direct observation of 883 mbar (hPa; 26.07 inHg) with surface winds of 52 mph (84 km/h)—remains the lowest directly-measured central pressure in a Western Hemisphere tropical cyclone.)

During the overnight hours of October 22–23, Patricia turned northwest and decelerated slightly as it reached the western edge of the mid-level ridge. Rapid development continued into October 23, and the hurricane reached Category 5 status by 00:00 UTC, with winds estimated at 175 mph (280 km/h). Convection cooled even further, with cloud tops colder than −130 °F (−90 °C) surrounding an 8 mi (13 km) wide eye by 03:00 UTC. In a 24-hour span, Patricia's winds increased by 120 mph (195 km/h) and its central pressure fell by 95 mbar (hPa; 2.81 inHg). Around 06:00 UTC, an Air Force Reserve reconnaissance aircraft measured flight-level winds of 221 mph (356 km/h) and the aircraft's stepped frequency microwave radiometer (SFMR) observed surface winds of 210 mph (340 km/h). (Note: The maximum SFMR winds for the 06:00 UTC mission were operationally withheld for quality assurance and later determined to be accurate.) Furthermore, the final dropsonde observation from that mission at about 06:45 UTC indicated a central pressure of 879 mbar (hPa; 25.96 inHg). (Note: This pressure value was extrapolated from an observation of 885 mbar (hPa; 26.13 inHg) with surface winds of 66 mph (106 km/h).) Rapid development continued after the aircraft left the hurricane, as the three pressure readings during the mission indicated that the pressure fell at a rate of more than 7 mbar (hPa; 0.207 inHg) per hour. Their findings also revealed an extraordinarily tight pressure gradient of 24 mbar (hPa; 0.709 inHg) per nautical mile, among the steepest gradients on record.

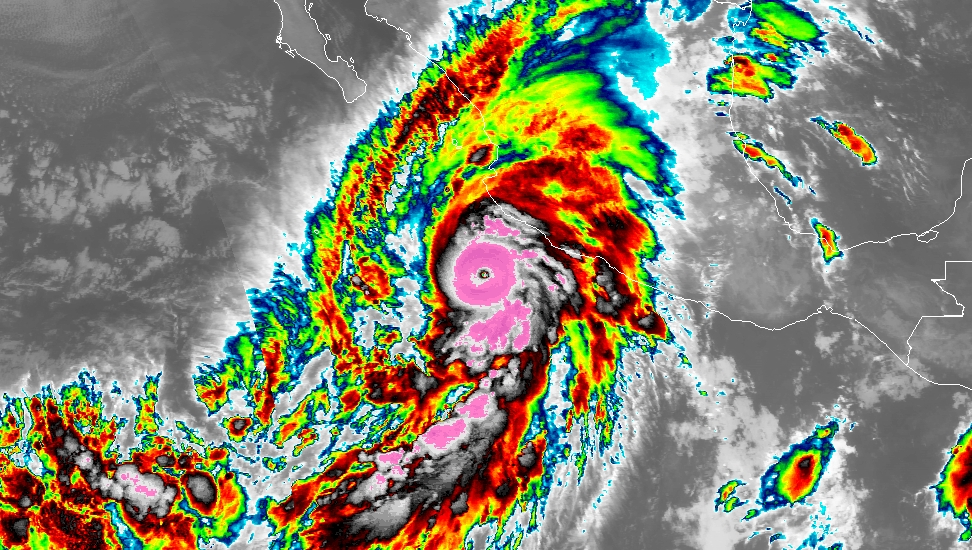
Infrared satellite image of Hurricane Patricia at record peak intensity captured by GOES-13/15

Based on continued improvement of the hurricane's satellite appearance, Patricia is assessed to have achieved its peak intensity around 12:00 UTC on October 23; the storm was situated about 150 mi (240 km) southwest of Manzanillo, Mexico. Maximum winds are estimated at 215 mph (345 km/h) alongside a pressure of 872 mbar (hPa; 25.75 inHg), making Patricia the second-most intense tropical cyclone ever observed. It is possible that Patricia surpassed the all-time record of 870 mbar (hPa; 25.69 inHg) set by Typhoon Tip in 1979 given the rate of deepening observed during the early morning mission. The violent, compact core of Patricia was roughly 25 mi (40 km) wide with the radius of maximum winds extending only 7 mi (11 km).

Little change in strength took place for the next six hours; a shortwave trough crossing the Baja California Peninsula turned Patricia to the northeast and induced acceleration. Another reconnaissance mission around 18:00 UTC once again recorded a central pressure of 879 mbar (hPa; 25.96 inHg). The aircraft was battered by severe turbulence (the result of updrafts and downdrafts) and the crew experienced maximum g-forces of +3.0 and -1.5.

== Landfall and dissipation ==
Satellite animation of Patricia from 13:15–23:45 UTC on October 23. During this time, the hurricane weakened at an unprecedented rate over water because of an eyewall replacement cycle before striking Mexico; however, it still retained winds of 150 mph (240 km/h) as it moved ashore.

Late on October 23, radar imagery depicted the formation of a secondary outer eyewall, indicative of an eyewall replacement cycle. By 20:30 UTC, the final pass by reconnaissance, the hurricane's flight-level winds fell by 60 mph (97 km/h) and its central pressure rose at 8 mbar (hPa; 0.236 inHg) per hour. Coinciding with the eyewall replacement cycle was an increase in southwesterly wind shear, a factor that further accelerated Patricia's degradation. The hurricane's eye soon became cloud-filled and rapid weakening ensued at an unprecedented pace.

At 23:00 UTC, the cyclone made landfall at Cuixmala in the municipality of La Huerta, Jalisco—about 55 mi (89 km) west-northwest of Manzanillo—with estimated winds of 150 mph (240 km/h) and an estimated pressure of 932 mbar (hPa; 27.52 inHg). (Note: The landfall pressure is based upon several observations in the hurricane's eye and has an error margin of ± 2–3 mbar (hPa; 0.06–0.09 inHg).) This made Patricia the strongest hurricane recorded at the time to strike Mexico's Pacific coast, exceeding an unnamed storm in 1959 and Madeline in 1976 (the latter of which has not been reanalyzed); Patricia's record was later surpassed by Hurricane Otis in 2023. Although Patricia was operationally thought to have made landfall as a Category 5 hurricane with winds of 165 mph (270 km/h) and a pressure of 920 mbar (hPa; 27.17 inHg), reanalysis of available data suggested that the hurricane weakened more rapidly than originally thought: an automated station in Cuixmala measured a pressure of 934.2 mbar (934.2 hPa; 27.59 inHg), while Josh Morgerman in Emiliano Zapata, just inside the eye of Patricia, measured a pressure of 937.8 mbar (hPa; 27.69 inHg). His observations also indicated a pressure gradient of 11 mbar (hPa; 0.325 inHg) per nautical mile.

Patricia's winds at landfall are relatively uncertain, and the 150 mph (240 km/h) value is based upon the Knaff–Zehr–Courtney pressure–wind relationship and an extrapolation of a 54 mbar (hPa; 1.59 inHg) filling using the Dvorak technique. An additional equation stemming from work by Willoughby (1993) yielded a landfall intensity of 147 mph (237 km/h). A NOAA automated weather station at the Chamela-Cuixmala Biosphere Reserve, at an elevation of 280 ft (85 m), recorded sustained winds of 185 mph (298 km/h) and a maximum gust of 211 mph (340 km/h). Further raw data from this station indicated unrealistically high sustained winds of 266 mph (428 km/h) and a maximum gust of 1,138 mph (1,831 km/h). Based on the station's distance from Patricia's eye, outside the radius of maximum winds, the observations from this station are considered unreliable. The highest reliably measured winds of 98 mph (158 km/h) occurred in Pista between 22:30 and 23:00 UTC on October 23 before the anemometer failed.

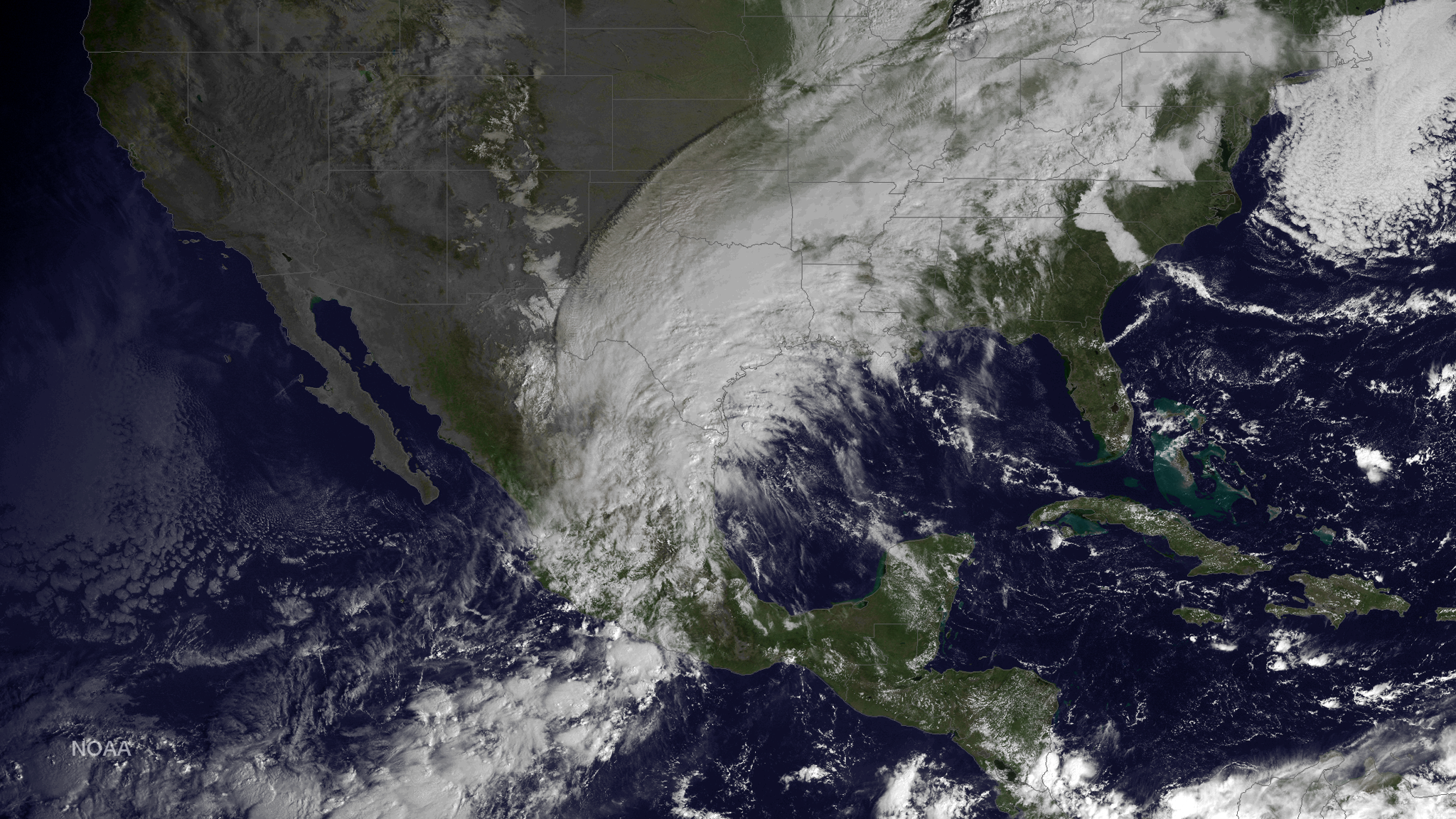
The remnants of Patricia—shortly after dissipation as a tropical cyclone—and a frontal boundary draped across the western Gulf Coast on October 24

Even faster weakening ensued through October 24 as the hurricane traversed the Sierra Madre mountains; its eye disappeared from satellite imagery within hours of moving ashore. The system weakened below hurricane strength by 03:00 UTC as it passed west of Guadalajara. Patricia accelerated inland between a trough over Northwestern Mexico and the ridge over the Gulf of Mexico. Convection dramatically decreased in organization and the low- and mid- to upper-level circulation centers of the cyclone soon decoupled. The system degraded into a tropical depression by 12:00 UTC as little organized convection remained, and the storm dissipated shortly thereafter over central Mexico. Unimpeded by the mountains of Mexico, the mid- to upper-level circulation of Patricia, accompanied by considerable moisture, continued northeast and interacted with a cold front over the western Gulf of Mexico. The new system produced flooding rains across large areas of Arkansas, Louisiana, Mississippi, and Texas.

Pacific hurricanes with a wind speed of 130 mph (215 km/h) or higher at landfall
Hurricane	Season	Wind speed	Ref.
Otis	2023	160 mph (260 km/h)	
Patricia	2015	150 mph (240 km/h)	
Madeline	1976	145 mph (230 km/h)	
Twelve	1957	140 mph (220 km/h)	
"Mexico"	1959	140 mph (220 km/h)	
Iniki	1992	140 mph (220 km/h)	
Kenna	2002	140 mph (220 km/h)	
Lidia	2023	140 mph (220 km/h)	

== Records ==
With maximum sustained winds of 215 mph (345 km/h) and a minimum pressure of 872 mbar (hPa; 25.75 inHg), Hurricane Patricia is the second-most intense tropical cyclone ever observed, just shy of Typhoon Tip in 1979 which had a minimum pressure of 870 mbar (hPa; 25.69 inHg). It is also the strongest tropical cyclone ever recorded in the Western Hemisphere. It exceeded the previous sustained wind record of 190 mph (305 km/h) set by Hurricane Allen in 1980 and the pressure record of 882 mbar (hPa; 26.05 inHg) set by Hurricane Wilma in 2005, both in the Atlantic basin. In the Eastern Pacific basin, north of the equator and east of the International Date Line, the previous basin record-holder was Hurricane Linda in 1997 with winds of 185 mph (295 km/h) and a pressure of 902 mbar (hPa; 26.64 inHg). Reconnaissance also found a pressure gradient of 24 mbar (hPa; 0.709 inHg) per nautical mile early on October 23, among the steepest gradients ever observed in a tropical cyclone.

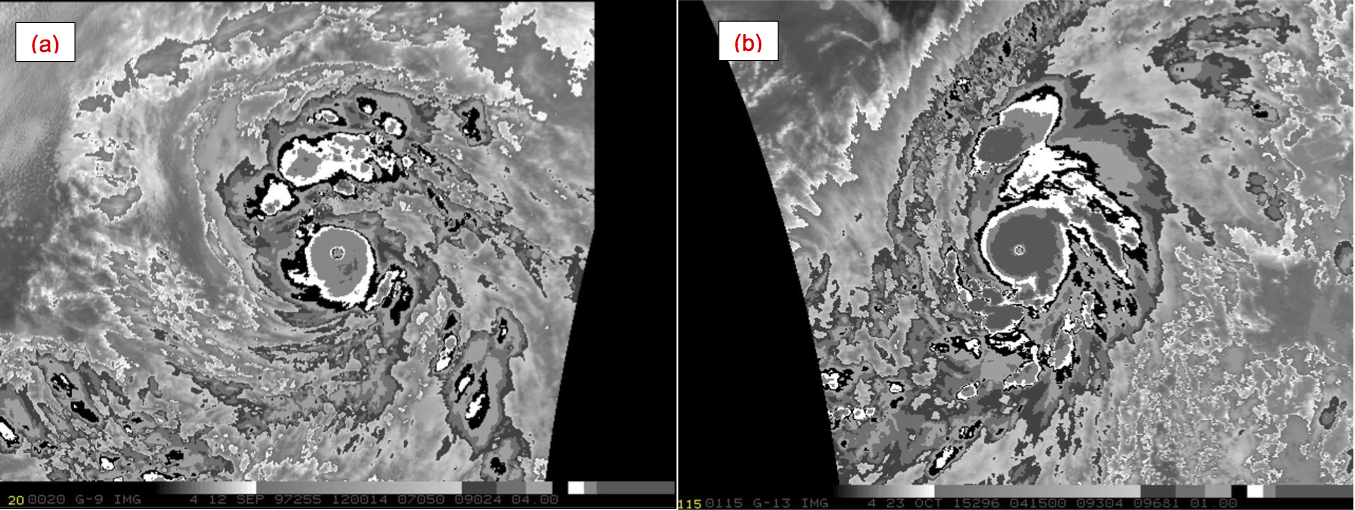
Comparison of Dvorak-enhanced (BD curve) infrared imagery of Hurricanes Linda (left) and Patricia (right). The "cold dark gray" ring around Patricia's eye represents cloud tops of −81 °C (−114 °F) or colder, more intense than the "cold medium gray" ring surrounding Linda's eye.

On a global scale, Patricia's one-minute maximum sustained winds rank as the highest ever reliably observed or estimated globally in a tropical cyclone, surpassing Typhoon Haiyan of 2013, although the intensity of Haiyan was only estimated via satellite imagery (T8.0, the highest rating on the Dvorak scale). Since no aircraft reconnaissance was available for Haiyan, the record set by Patricia is uncertain and comparing the intensities of the two storms is problematic. According to the World Meteorological Organization, Typhoon Nancy of 1961 also produced 215 mph (345 km/h) sustained winds; however, it is widely accepted that Western Pacific reconnaissance during the 1940s to 1960s overestimated cyclone intensity and Nancy's record is considered questionable. The most powerful wind gust produced by a tropical cyclone, as well as the highest non-tornadic winds ever recorded, is still retained by Cyclone Olivia in 1996: 253 mph (407 km/h) was observed on Barrow Island, Western Australia.

The magnitude of Patricia's rapid intensification is among the fastest ever observed. In a 24-hour period, 06:00–06:00 UTC October 22–23, its maximum sustained winds increased from 85 mph (140 km/h) to 205 mph (335 km/h). This represents a record increase of 120 mph (195 km/h). During the same period, Patricia's central pressure fell by 95 mbar (hPa; 2.81 inHg). This fell just short of the world-record intensification set by Typhoon Forrest in 1983, which featured a pressure drop of 100 mbar (hPa; 2.953 inHg) in just under 24 hours. With winds of 150 mph (240 km/h) and a pressure of 932 mbar (hPa; 27.52 inHg) at landfall, Patricia was the strongest landfalling Pacific hurricane on record at the time. The previous wind record at landfall was 145 mph (230 km/h), set by Hurricane Madeline in 1976, and the previous pressure record was 941 mbar (hPa; 27.79 inHg), set by Hurricane Odile in 2014. However, Patricia was surpassed by Hurricane Otis of 2023 in both regards, with winds of 160 mph (260 km/h) and a pressure of 929 mbar (hPa; 27.43 inHg). Similarly, the hurricane featured the fastest weakening while still over water in NHC's area of responsibility, with a pressure rise of 54 mbar (hPa; 1.59 inHg) in the five hours before it made landfall. Furthermore, a dropsonde observed a 700 mbar height temperature of 32.2 °C (90.0 °F) in the eye of Patricia. This is one of the highest temperatures ever observed in a tropical cyclone's eye worldwide.

== See also ==
Other record-strength tropical cyclones:

- Hurricane Linda in 1997 – Previous record intensity in eastern Pacific basin, during a similarly strong El Niño event
- Typhoon Megi in 2010 – Research reconnaissance observed similarly intense sustained winds
- Typhoon Goni in 2020 – Strongest landfalling tropical cyclone by 1-minute sustained winds
- Typhoon Nancy in 1961 – Tied with Patricia for the highest winds observed in a tropical cyclone, considered unreliable
- Typhoon Tip in 1979 – Most intense tropical cyclone recorded in terms of pressure
- Hurricane Wilma in 2005 – Previous record low central pressure in the Western Hemisphere, still record low for the Atlantic
- Hurricane Allen in 1980 – Previous record high sustained winds in the Western Hemisphere, still record high for the Atlantic, now tied with Hurricane Melissa in the 2025 Atlantic hurricane season
- Typhoon Forrest in 1983 – Record-fastest intensification of any tropical cyclone; underwent a 100 mbar (hPa; 2.953 inHg) pressure drop in just under 24 hours
