= Hurricane Madeline (1998) =

Category 1 Pacific hurricane in 1998

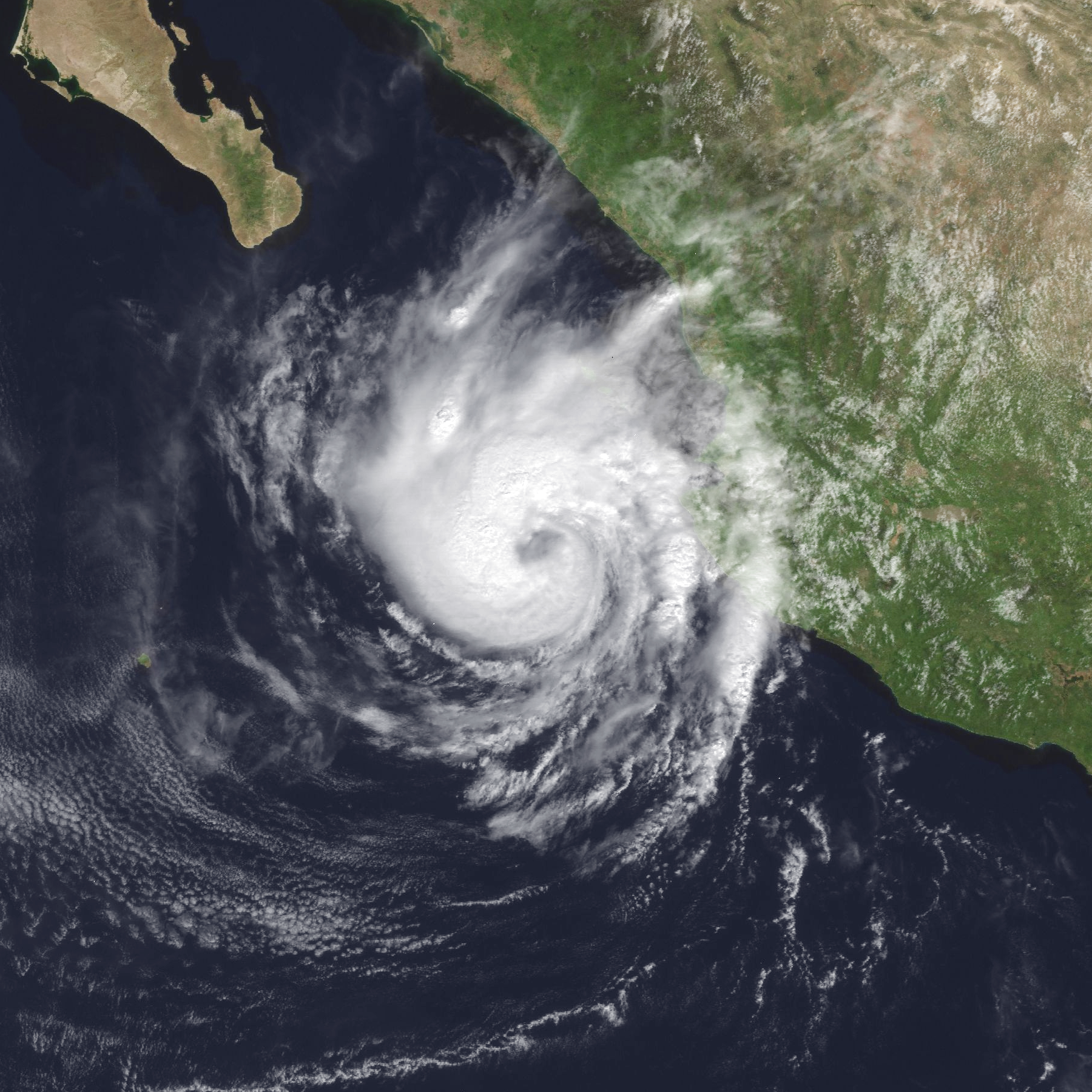
- Madeline as a newly-upgraded hurricane on October 17

Meteorological history
- Formed: October 16, 1998
- Dissipated: October 20, 1998

Category 1 hurricane
- 1-minute sustained (SSHWS/NWS)
- Highest winds: 85 mph (140 km/h)
- Lowest pressure: 979 mbar (hPa); 28.91 inHg

Overall effects
- Fatalities: 31 total
- Damage: $750 million (1998 USD)
- Areas affected: Mexico, Baja California Peninsula, Texas
- IBTrACS
- Part of the 1998 Pacific hurricane season

Hurricane Madeline was a costly tropical cyclone whose remnants caused hundreds of millions of dollars in damage in Texas in October 1998. The final tropical cyclone of the 1998 Pacific hurricane season, Madeline originated from a tropical wave that emerged off the coast of Africa on September 25, 1998. The wave traversed the Atlantic Ocean and crossed over Central America on October 5 or 6. Gradually, the system intensified and was classified as a tropical depression on October 16, a tropical storm later that day, and a hurricane on October 17. The storm reached peak winds of 85 mph (137 km/h) about 95 miles (153 km) southwest of San Blas, Nayarit, and after 18 hours it subsequently began to weaken. Although Madeline never made landfall, numerous rainbands affected the Mexican coast causing no known damage or fatalities. The remnant moisture moved north and contributed to flooding in central Texas, which killed 31 people and caused $750 million (1998 USD; $1.45 billion 2025 USD) in damage.

== Meteorological history ==
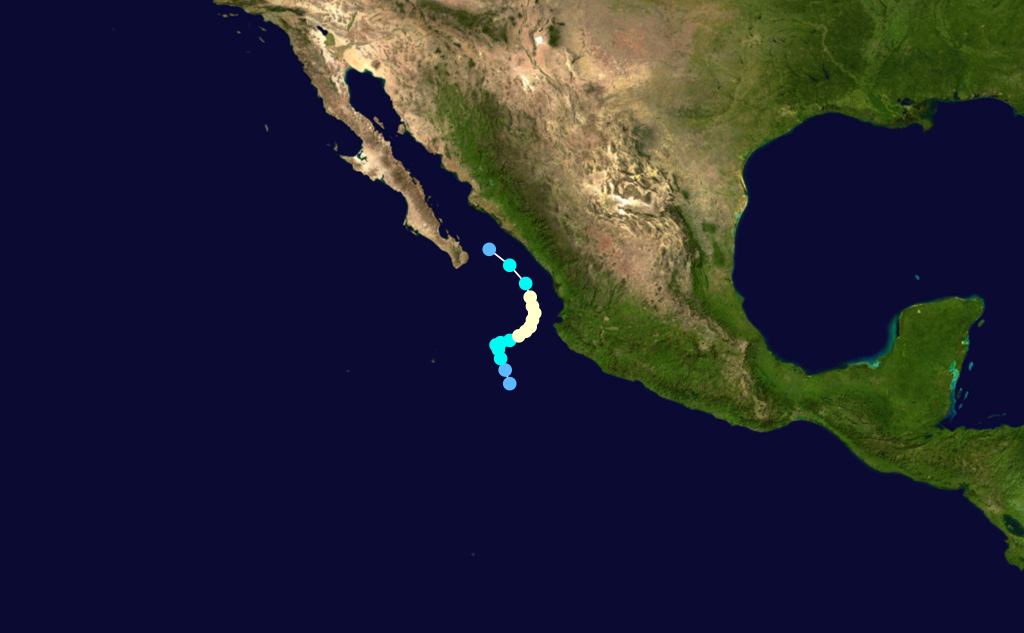
Map plotting the storm's track and intensity, according to the Saffir–Simpson scale Map key Saffir–Simpson scale Tropical depression (≤38 mph, ≤62 km/h) Tropical storm (39–73 mph, 63–118 km/h) Category 1 (74–95 mph, 119–153 km/h) Category 2 (96–110 mph, 154–177 km/h) Category 3 (111–129 mph, 178–208 km/h) Category 4 (130–156 mph, 209–251 km/h) Category 5 (≥157 mph, ≥252 km/h) Unknown Storm type Tropical cyclone Subtropical cyclone Extratropical cyclone, remnant low, tropical disturbance, or monsoon depression

On September 25, 1998, a tropical wave emerged off the coast of Africa, producing intermittent concentrated clusters of convective activity. The wave traversed the Atlantic Ocean and the Caribbean Sea before crossing Central America on October 5 or October 6. After several days, convection increased, and Dvorak classifications initiated. Satellite imagery indicated that the system dissipated on October 11, although an area of cloudiness persisted off the coast of Mexico. After four days, the system regenerated and under diffluent flow aloft, deep convection became more concentrated; it is estimated that a tropical depression formed at 0000 UTC on October 16, about 230 mi (370 km) west-southwest of Manzanillo, Mexico. Initially, due to disorganization, determining the forward movement of depression was difficult, although a few hours later it was estimated that the system was tracking to the north-northwest. With favorable conditions aloft, the deep convection became more concentrated, and 12 hours after first developing, the depression intensified into Tropical Storm Madeline about 170 miles (270 km) southwest of Cabo Corrientes.

During the afternoon, convective cloud tops warmed slightly although the storm continued to intensify. Soon after, thunderstorm activity became limited as Madeline remained generally stationary in movement. An approaching mid-level trough turned Madeline to the northeast. Banding features gradually improved in organization, and late on October 17 the storm attained hurricane status. However, satellite imagery indicated that convective activity was confined to the western portion of the storm, and at the same time an eye began to form. Early on October 18, data from a Reconnaissance aircraft flight into the storm found a minimum central pressure of 985 mbar (29.1 inHg), as the storm was drifting to the northeast at around 4 mph (6.4 km/h) near the western edge of a large-scale east–west ridge axis. The apparent eye became cloud-filled shortly thereafter, and a slight increase in temperature was discovered near the center. Despite this, upper-level outflow was favorable, leading to predictions of slight intensification.

Shortly thereafter, Madeline attained peak winds of 85 mph (137 km/h) about 95 miles (153 km) southwest of San Blas, Nayarit. The hurricane maintained peak winds for about 18 hours while curving again to the northwest. With evidence of southern wind shear, only a small area of deep thunderstorm activity existed on October 19, and the system began to appear ill-defined of satellite imagery. The hurricane quickly weakened into a tropical storm, and by later that day, the storm became void of convection due to strong wind shear. On October 19, the storm was downgraded to a tropical depression, leaving just a swirl of low clouds midway between the southern tip of Baja California and mainland Mexico. By 0600 UTC on October 20, the remnants of Madeline had completely dissipated.

== Preparations and impact ==
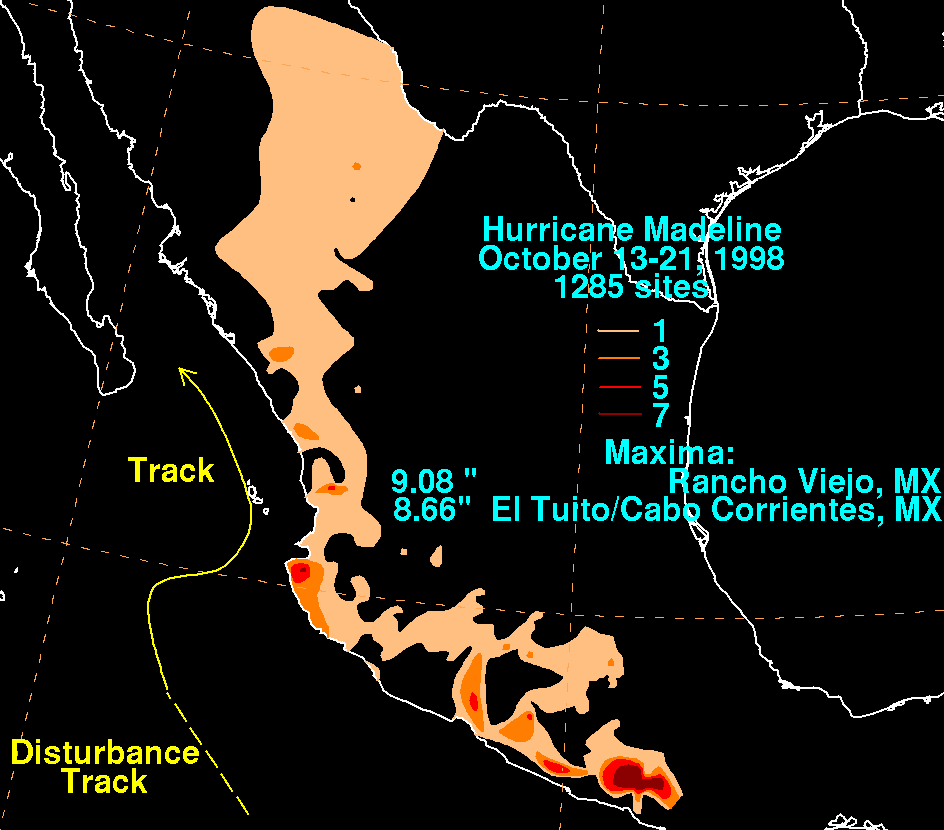
Rainfall estimates in Mexico provided by the Meteorological Prediction Center

In anticipation of Madeline, the government of Mexico issued a tropical storm warning for the Baja California Peninsula southward from La Paz, and a hurricane warning from San Patricio, Jalisco to El Dorado, Sinaloa, including the Islas Marías. The storm was initially forecast to move ashore near Mazatlán, prompting officials to close the city's port. President Ernesto Zedillo advised potentially affected residents to stay indoors or seek refuge in shelters. Also, the threat of the hurricane canceled a fishing expedition in the Gulf of California due to rough surf. The expedition was to provide a new aquarium in downtown Denver, Colorado with about 8,500 fish. Mexican authorities deployed 2,000 soldiers in remote areas of the Pacific coast state of Sinaloa to prepare for the hurricane. Several thousand residents and tourists at the resorts of Puerto Vallarta and Mazatlan were put on standby to evacuate their homes. Authorities along the coast in the state of Nayarit went house to house, advising people about the oncoming storm. In addition, ships from Salina Cruz to Acapulco were advised to stay in port.

Costliest Pacific hurricanes
| Rank | Cyclone | Season | Damage | Ref |
|---|---|---|---|---|
| 1 | 5 Otis | 2023 | $12–16 billion | |
| 2 | 1 Manuel | 2013 | $4.2 billion | |
| 3 | 4 Iniki | 1992 | $3.1 billion | |
| 4 | 3 John | 2024 | $2.45 billion | |
| 5 | 4 Odile | 2014 | $1.82 billion | |
| 6 | TS Agatha | 2010 | $1.1 billion | |
| 7 | 4 Hilary | 2023 | $948 million | |
| 8 | 5 Willa | 2018 | $825 million | |
| 9 | 1 Madeline | 1998 | $750 million | |
| 10 | 2 Rosa | 1994 | $700 million | |

Although Madeline never crossed the coast, numerous rainbands affected the Mexican coast, dropping up to 9.8 in (250 mm). Despite this, no damage or fatalities were reported in Mexico. After the storm had dissipated, the remnant plume of moisture contributed to severe flooding in central Texas. Rainfall in Texas reached 22 inches (560 mm) in some locations. Thirty-one people died due to the flooding, and damage totaled to $750 million (1998 USD). A total of 24 of the deaths were drownings, 22 of them were caused by driving vehicles into high water on a road flooded by the torrential downpours. There were 16 different incidents when these types of deaths occurred, four of them involving in multiple deaths. Three others died due to trauma, and one died from hypothermia after the person was submerged in the water. The greatest impact was in Southern Texas, which included the urban areas of San Antonio and Austin, and all of their surrounding suburbs. The counties with the most significant rainfall, damage, and fatalities were Travis County, Bexar County, Guadalupe County, Comal County, and Caldwell County. This area included both the cities of San Antonio and Austin. In a small area in Caldwell County, there was 29 inches (740 mm) of rain estimated by the United States Geological Survey. This included the area of Lockhart, Texas, which was badly flooded by the storm due to its close proximity to the San Marcos River. Most of the county picked up an estimated 20 to 30 in (510 to 760 mm) of rain, including San Marcos, Texas, New Braunfels, Texas, and Kyle, Texas. In all, portions of 60 counties in Texas were flooded and hundreds of people were forced to flee their homes.

Due to the flooding, twenty counties were declared federal disaster areas, clearing the way for assistance such as federal loans. Then-president Bill Clinton promised aid to the victims of the storm and then-governor George W. Bush took a tour of the devastated region with the Federal Emergency Management Agency director.

== See also ==
- Other tropical cyclones named Madeline
- Tropical Storm Norman (2012)
- Hurricane Rosa (1994)
- List of Pacific hurricanes
