= Hurricane Madeline (1976) =

Category 4 Pacific hurricane in 1976

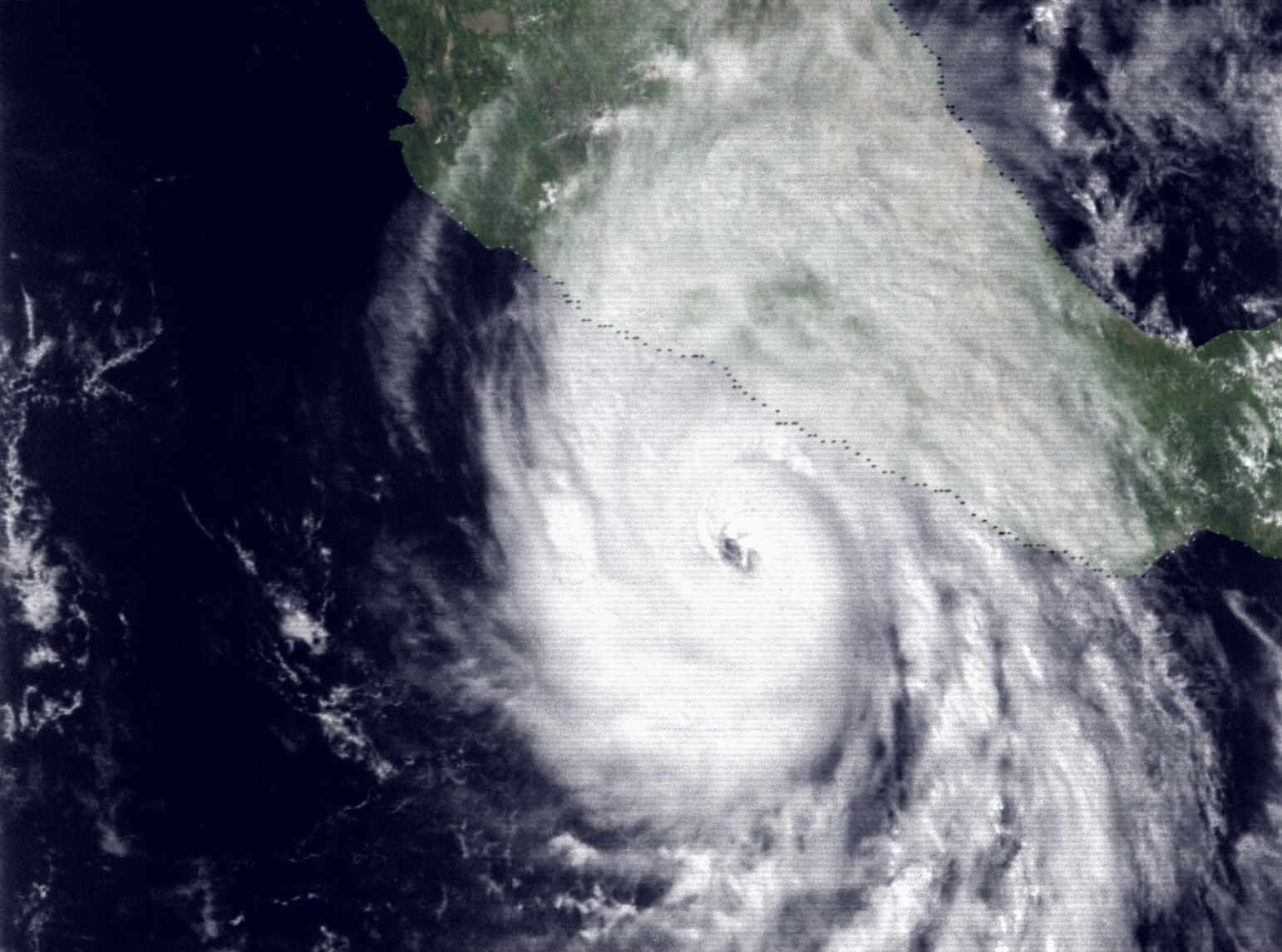
- Hurricane Madeline off the coast of Mexico

Meteorological history
- Formed: September 29, 1976
- Dissipated: October 8, 1976

Category 4 major hurricane
- 1-minute sustained (SSHWS/NWS)
- Highest winds: 145 mph (230 km/h)
- Lowest pressure: 940 mbar (hPa); 27.76 inHg

Overall effects
- Fatalities: 7 direct
- Damage: $200 million
- Areas affected: Central Western Mexico
- Part of the 1976 Pacific hurricane season

Hurricane Madeline was the second landfalling major hurricane along the Pacific coast of Mexico in a week. Madeline formed on September 29, not far from Central America. The next day, the circulation dissipated, and as a result weakened to a remnant low. Four days later, on October 3, the low regenerated into a tropical depression. The system remained weak for three days as it drifted west-northwest. When it began to recurve towards Mexico on October 6, the cyclone rapidly intensified and eventually made landfall at peak intensity as a Category 4. Shortly after landfall, the cyclone rapidly dissipated.

Prior to the arrival of Madeline, 15,000 people evacuated from the coast, which had already been impacted by Hurricane Liza. Heavy damage was reported along with seven fatalities. Two dams were flooded and extensive crop damage was reported.

== Meteorological history ==
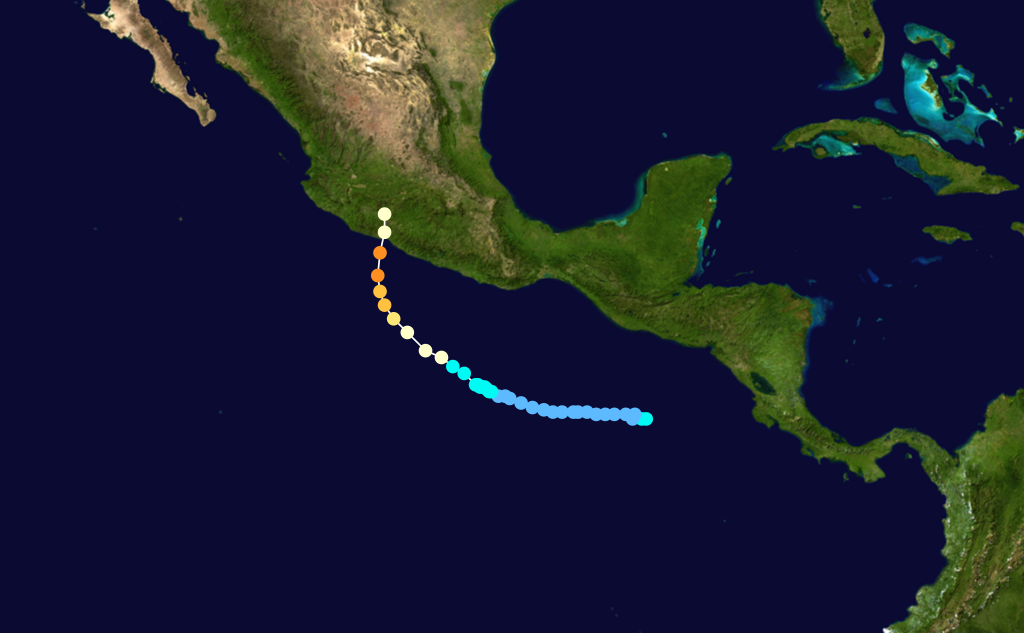
Map plotting the storm's track and intensity, according to the Saffir–Simpson scale Map key Saffir–Simpson scale Tropical depression (≤38 mph, ≤62 km/h) Tropical storm (39–73 mph, 63–118 km/h) Category 1 (74–95 mph, 119–153 km/h) Category 2 (96–110 mph, 154–177 km/h) Category 3 (111–129 mph, 178–208 km/h) Category 4 (130–156 mph, 209–251 km/h) Category 5 (≥157 mph, ≥252 km/h) Unknown Storm type Tropical cyclone Subtropical cyclone Extratropical cyclone, remnant low, tropical disturbance, or monsoon depression

Early on September 27, 1976, the Eastern Pacific Hurricane Center (EPHC) reported that a tropical disturbance had formed about 770 km (480 mi) to the southwest of San Jose, Costa Rica. During the next two days the disturbance slowly developed while moving northwest. By the morning of September 29, the disturbance was upgraded to a 40 mph (65 km/h) tropical storm and based on ship reports and satellite imagery. Due to the fact that it attained tropical storm status, it was named Madeline. At this time, the cyclone had developed a center of circulation. Its intensification was short-lived and Madeline remained at tropical storm strength for just 12 hours before it was downgraded into a tropical depression. Madeline remained at tropical depression strength until September 30. At that time, the EPHC reported that the circulation center was no longer visible and downgraded the system to a remnant low, while located 575 mi (925 km) to the southeast of Acapulco, Mexico.

Over the following days, the low moved towards the west and started to regenerate with a circulation center becoming visible early on October 3. Based on this, the EPHC re-upgraded Madeline to a tropical depression. Continuing to intensify, Madeline was soon upgraded to a tropical storm for the second time. During the next day or two, Madeline remained near stationary before turning towards the northeast on October 5. As the cyclone moved over an area of warm seas surface temperatures, the storm started to intensify. During the next day, Madeline slowly developed an eye before intensifying into a hurricane. In addition, a Hurricane Hunter aircraft reported winds 75 mph (120 km/h) winds and a pressure of 984 millibars.

During October 7, with warm water helping to fuel its intensification, Madeline quickly intensified into a Category 2 hurricane, and was upgraded to a major hurricane (Category 3 or higher on the Saffir-Simpson Hurricane Scale) early on October 8. Based on hurricane hunter reports, Madeline reached its peak sustained winds of 145 mph (230 km/h) and a peak pressure of 940 millibars early on the 8th. This made Madeline a moderate Category 4 hurricane. Later that morning Madeline made landfall to the northwest of Zihuatanejo as a powerful Category 4 hurricane, before it rapidly dissipated over land.

== Preparations and impact ==
Pacific hurricanes with a wind speed of 130 mph (215 km/h) or higher at landfall
Hurricane	Season	Wind speed	Ref.
Otis	2023	160 mph (260 km/h)	
Patricia	2015	150 mph (240 km/h)	
Madeline	1976	145 mph (230 km/h)	
Twelve	1957	140 mph (220 km/h)	
"Mexico"	1959	140 mph (220 km/h)	
Iniki	1992	140 mph (220 km/h)	
Kenna	2002	140 mph (220 km/h)	
Lidia	2023	140 mph (220 km/h)	

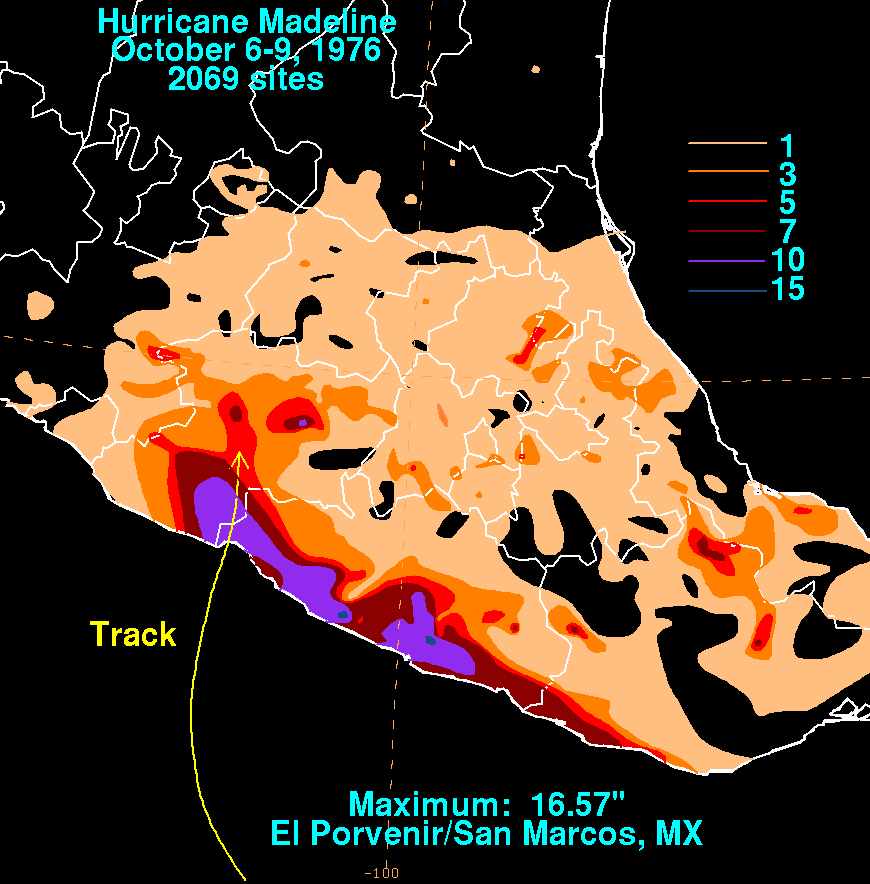
Rainfall from Hurricane Madeline

Mexican army headquarters put in effect an emergency plan three days prior to the arrival of the hurricane. An estimated 15,000 people evacuated from threatened areas in the path of Madeline. According to one report, evacuations prior to Madeline were considered a success. Hurricane warnings and flood warnings were issued along the coastlines of Michoacán and Guerrero. In addition, tropical storm warnings were issued for nine states in Mexico. This warning area extended as far inland as the area west of the Gulf of Mexico.

Hurricane Madeline produced heavy rains over Mexico, peaking at 16.57 in (421 mm), rainfall fell at El Povenir/San Marcos. According to Comision Nacional del Agua, a parent agency of the Servicio Meteorológico Nacional, rainfall fell at 2,069 sites. Damage from the hurricane was considered to be severe. In Chilpancingo, Guerrero, two people drowned from the hurricane. In addition, five other deaths were reported. The cyclone also flooded two major hydro-electrical dams and power outages were reported. While no serious damage was reported in Zihuatanejo, many boats were damaged. In addition, the storm caused extensive crop damage. Losses from Madeline, combined with previous hurricanes Liza and Kathleen, were estimated at $200 million (1976 USD). It was the second storm to strike Mexico within a week; Hurricane Liza was the first. When Madeline was over the ocean, it impacted several ships, but no major damage from these ships was reported.

== See also ==
- 1959 Mexico hurricane
- Hurricane Kenna
- Hurricane Patricia (second-strongest landfalling eastern Pacific hurricane on record)
- Hurricane Otis (strongest landfalling eastern Pacific hurricane on record, first on record at Category 5 strength)
- Other storms named Madeline
- List of Category 4 Pacific hurricanes
