= List of storms named Madeline =

The name Madeline has been used for nine tropical cyclones in the Eastern Pacific Ocean and one in the Western Pacific Ocean.

In the Eastern Pacific:

- Tropical Depression Madeline (1961) – downgraded in post-analysis, should not have been named
- Tropical Storm Madeline (1968) – never threatened land
- Hurricane Madeline (1976) – strong Category 4 hurricane that made landfall near Zihuatanejo, causing heavy damage
- Tropical Storm Madeline (1980) – short-lived storm, stayed out to sea
- Tropical Storm Madeline (1986) – not a threat to land
- Tropical Storm Madeline (1992) – stayed out to sea
- Hurricane Madeline (1998) – Category 1 hurricane that threatened Islas Marías and parts of Mexico before dissipating, caused no damage
- Hurricane Madeline (2016) – Category 4 hurricane that threatened Hawaii but took a different route before approaching the islands
- Tropical Storm Madeline (2022) – caused minor damage as it moved along the coast of southwestern Mexico

In the Western Pacific:

- Typhoon Madeline (1949) (T4912)
