= Hurricane Kenna =

Category 5 Pacific hurricane in 2002

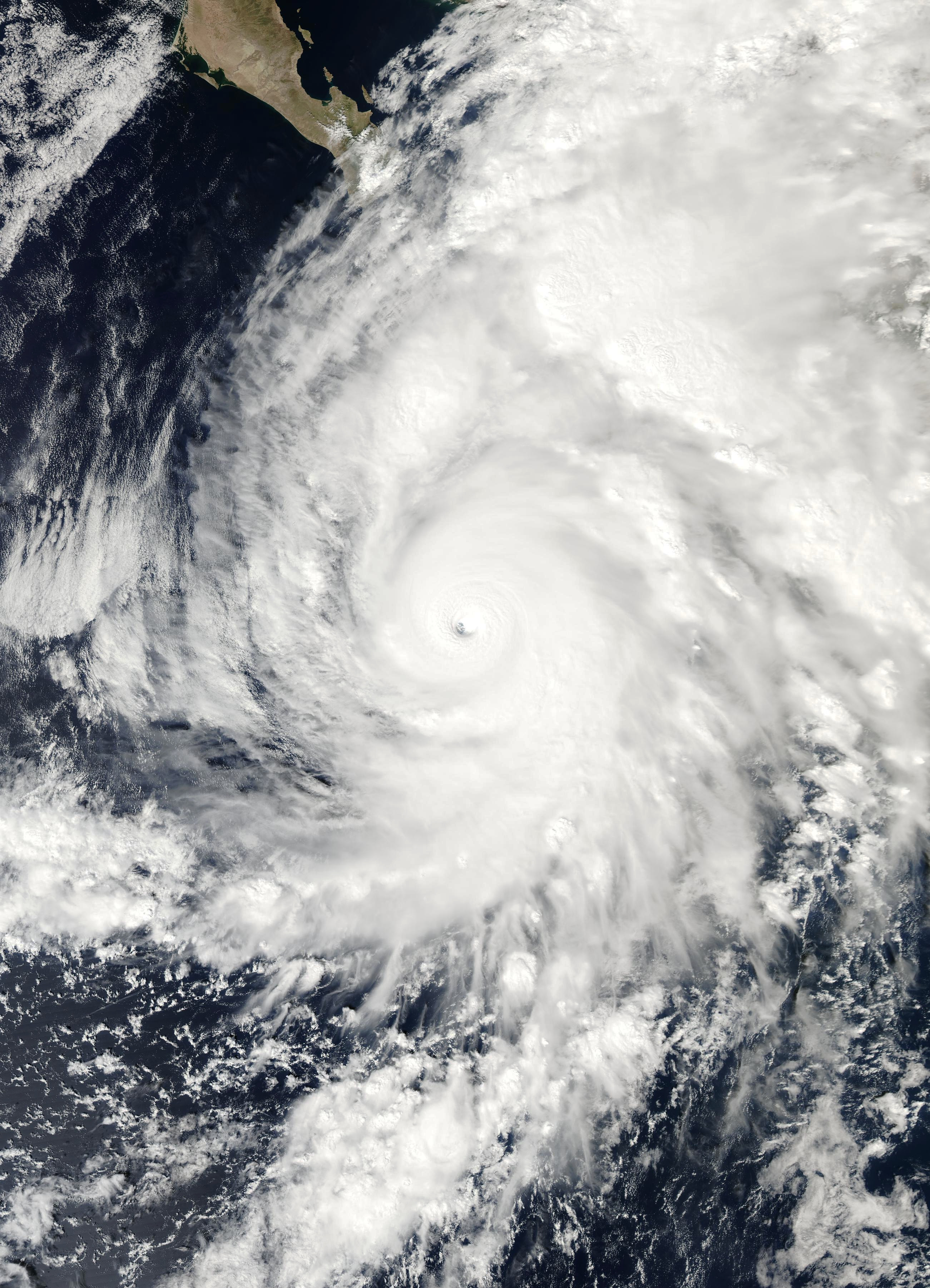
- Hurricane Kenna approaching Mexico on October 24

Meteorological history
- Formed: October 22, 2002
- Dissipated: October 26, 2002

Category 5 major hurricane
- 1-minute sustained (SSHWS/NWS)
- Highest winds: 165 mph (270 km/h)
- Lowest pressure: 913 mbar (hPa); 26.96 inHg

Overall effects
- Fatalities: 7 total
- Damage: $101 million (2002 USD)
- Areas affected: Western Mexico, Southern United States
- IBTrACS
- Part of the 2002 Pacific hurricane season

Hurricane Kenna was the third-most intense Pacific hurricane to make landfall on the Pacific coast of Mexico. Kenna was the sixteenth tropical depression, thirteenth tropical storm, seventh hurricane, sixth major hurricane, and third Category 5 hurricane of the 2002 Pacific hurricane season. After forming on October 22 to the south of Mexico from a tropical wave, forecasters consistently predicted the storm to strengthen much less than it actually did. Moving into an area of favorable upper-level conditions and warm sea surface temperatures, Kenna rapidly intensified to reach maximum sustained winds of 165 mph (270 km/h) on October 25, making it as a Category 5 hurricane, while located about 255 mi (410 km) southwest of Puerto Vallarta, Jalisco. Weakening as it turned to the northeast, the hurricane made landfall near San Blas, Nayarit, as a Category 4 hurricane, with sustained winds of 140 mph (225 km/h), before dissipating over the Sierra Madre Occidental mountains on October 26.

Hurricane Kenna caused US$101 million in damage and four deaths. In Mexico, the worst of the hurricane's effects occurred between San Blas in Nayarit and Puerto Vallarta in Jalisco, where over 100 people were injured, and thousands of homes and businesses were damaged or destroyed. 95% of the buildings in San Blas were damaged, and hundreds of buildings were destroyed along coastal areas of Puerto Vallarta. The remnants of Kenna produced rainfall in the south-central United States, peaking at 0.562 in (14.28 mm) in Beaumont, Texas, where a driver was killed by floods. A month after the storm, floodwaters from Kenna caused a dengue fever outbreak in western Jalisco that killed two people. The name Kenna was later retired from the list of Pacific hurricane names due to its effects.

== Meteorological history ==
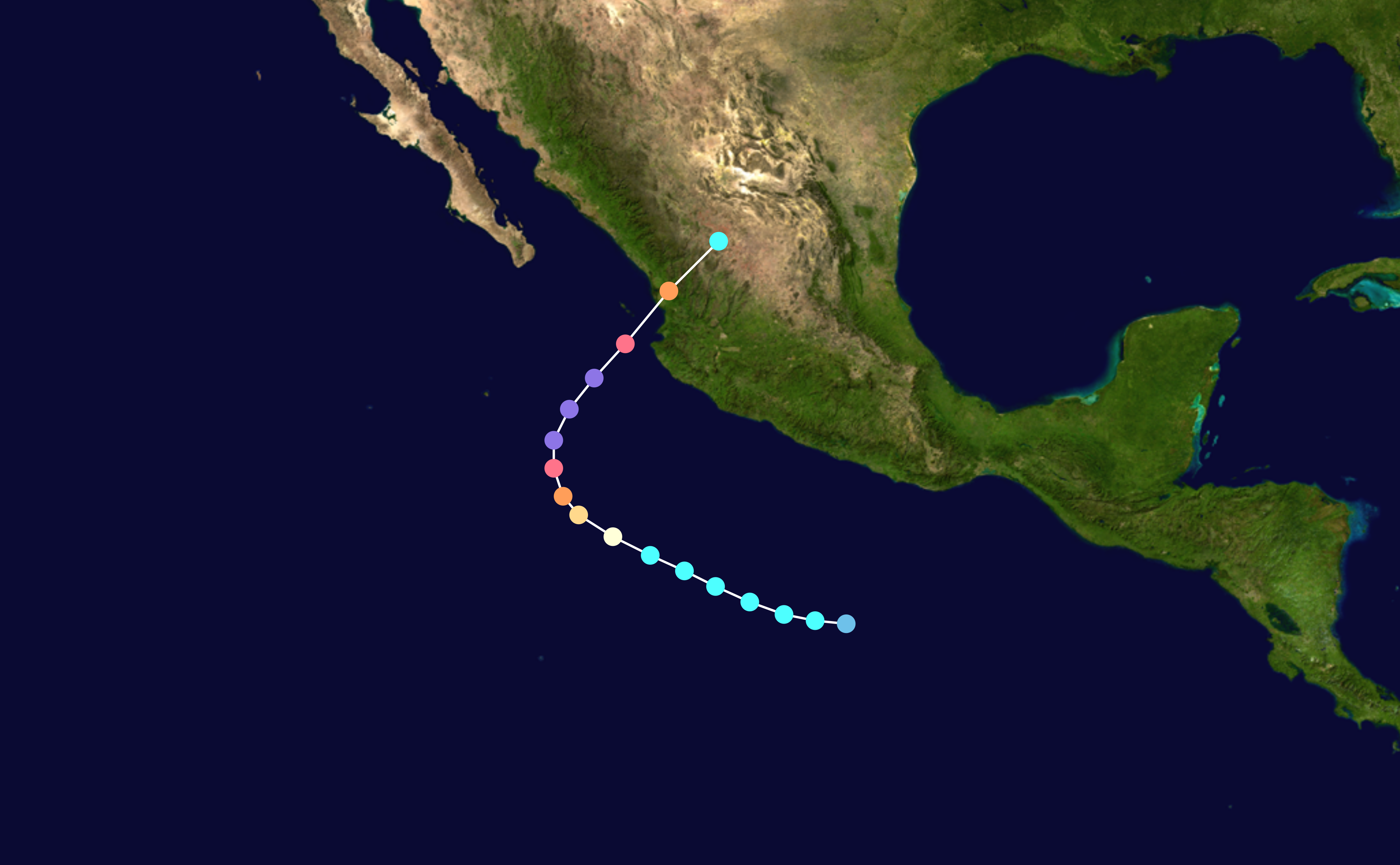
Map plotting the storm's track and intensity, according to the Saffir–Simpson scale Map key Saffir–Simpson scale Tropical depression (≤38 mph, ≤62 km/h) Tropical storm (39–73 mph, 63–118 km/h) Category 1 (74–95 mph, 119–153 km/h) Category 2 (96–110 mph, 154–177 km/h) Category 3 (111–129 mph, 178–208 km/h) Category 4 (130–156 mph, 209–251 km/h) Category 5 (≥157 mph, ≥252 km/h) Unknown Storm type Tropical cyclone Subtropical cyclone Extratropical cyclone, remnant low, tropical disturbance, or monsoon depression

On October 16, a tropical wave moved westward through the Caribbean Sea, possibly the same wave that passed near Barbados two days earlier. The wave entered the eastern Pacific Ocean on October 19, and the tropical disturbance gradually became better organized. Conditions favored continued development, and Dvorak classifications began late on October 20. Early on October 22, the system developed into a tropical depression, designated Fourteen-E, while located about 375 mi (600 km) south of Acapulco, Guerrero. Initially the depression was not well organized, with little inner convective structure and sporadic deep convection. Computer models predicted an increase in wind shear by 60 hours; as such the National Hurricane Center forecast the depression to strengthen up to maximum sustained winds of 45 mph (75 km/h) before weakening.

The depression moved westward and quickly became better organized with a great increase in convection near the center, and six hours after forming it strengthened into a tropical storm and was named Kenna on October 22. Upper-level outflow and banding features improved as well. With warm water temperatures of over 29 °C (84 °F) and updated model forecasts anticipating light amounts of vertical wind shear, forecasters predicted Kenna to slowly intensify to reach winds of 85 mph (137 km/h) within 72 hours. The storm turned west-northwest around the periphery of a mid-level high-pressure system, and initially failed to strengthen further with much of its convection being associated with outer rainbands. On October 23, the outer rainbands dissipated and convection became more concentrated near the center, which coincided with a steady increase in strength. Late on October 23, Kenna intensified into a hurricane while located about 460 mi (740 km) south of Cabo Corrientes, Jalisco.

Shortly after becoming a hurricane, Kenna began to rapidly intensify with a 15 mi (30 km) wide eye located within its well-defined central dense overcast. Early on October 24 Kenna became a major hurricane, and in a 24‑hour period the hurricane more than doubled its wind speed from 70 mph (110 km/h) winds to 145 mph (233 km/h). A large mid to upper-level trough turned Kenna to the north and northeast. Around 00:00 UTC on October 25, Kenna attained peak winds of 165 mph (270 km/h) about 255 mi (410 km) southwest of Puerto Vallarta, the third Category 5 hurricane of the season. The NHC estimated the minimum pressure at 913 mbar (27.0 inHg); this was based on the hurricane's improved appearance on satellite imagery, roughly five hours after a Hurricane Hunter flight recorded a pressure of 918 mbar (27.1 inHg).

Soon after Kenna reached peak intensity, it began weakening due to wind shear from the approaching trough. The hurricane developed a secondary outer eyewall while also producing significant amounts of lightning near the center. Intense convective activity increased as Kenna approached the Mexican coastline. At 16:30 UTC on October 25, Kenna made landfall near San Blas, Nayarit, as a Category 4 hurricane, with estimated sustained winds of 140 mph (220 km/h). At the time, Kenna was the third most intense Pacific hurricane to strike Mexico. The hurricane rapidly weakened over the mountainous terrain of western Mexico, and the circulation dissipated on October 26 over the Sierra Madre Occidental mountains. Continuing northeastward, the remnants moved into the Gulf of Mexico before proceeding into the southern United States and interacting with an upper-level trough. The remnants of Kenna remained identifiable until reaching Mississippi.

== Preparations ==
Pacific hurricanes with a wind speed of 130 mph (215 km/h) or higher at landfall
Hurricane	Season	Wind speed	Ref.
Otis	2023	160 mph (260 km/h)	
Patricia	2015	150 mph (240 km/h)	
Madeline	1976	145 mph (230 km/h)	
Twelve	1957	140 mph (220 km/h)	
"Mexico"	1959	140 mph (220 km/h)	
Iniki	1992	140 mph (220 km/h)	
Kenna	2002	140 mph (220 km/h)	
Lidia	2023	140 mph (220 km/h)	

About 27 hours before landfall, Mexican officials issued a hurricane watch from Mazatlán to Cabo Corrientes, Jalisco, with a tropical storm watch issued further south to Manzanillo. Six hours later when its track became more apparent, the watch was upgraded to a hurricane warning from Mazatlán to La Fortuna, with a tropical storm warning southward to Manzanillo.

Roughly 8,800 of the 9,000 residents in the landfall location, San Blas, evacuated, which ultimately contributed to a low death toll. Officials ordered for the evacuation of 50,000 residents and fishermen along the southwest coast of Mexico, including 3,000 in the Islas Marías, 10,000 near Mazatlán, and 15,000 near flood-prone areas. Civil authorities closed all schools and docks in potentially affected areas. The Mexican Red Cross prepared for the storm by shipping 215 tonnes of relief supplies such as food, water, clothing, and medicine to the Red Cross branch in Jalisco. Assistance from the Yucatán Peninsula delivered 10 tonnes of food and water, as well. The Mexican Red Cross prepared 20 emergency shelters in the state of Nayarit. Officials took security measures in Los Cabos, Baja California Sur, where the Asia-Pacific Economic Cooperation was meeting during the passage of the hurricane. Early forecasts indicated a possible threat to the meeting, causing the government to prepare for a potential alternate site. Officials recommended that boats stay at port due to severe conditions.

== Impact ==
Most intense Pacific hurricanes
Rank	Hurricane	Season	Pressure	
Rank	Hurricane	Season	hPa	inHg
1	5 Patricia	2015	872	25.75
2	5 Polo	2026	892	26.34
3	5 Linda	1997	902	26.64
4	5 Rick	2009	906	26.76
5	5 Kenna	2002	913	26.96
6	5 Ava	1973	915	27.02
6	5 Ioke	2006	915	27.02
8	5 Marie	2014	918	27.11
8	4 Odile	2014	918	27.11
10	5 Guillermo	1997	919	27.14
Listing is only for tropical cyclones in the Pacific Ocean north of the equator and east of the International Dateline

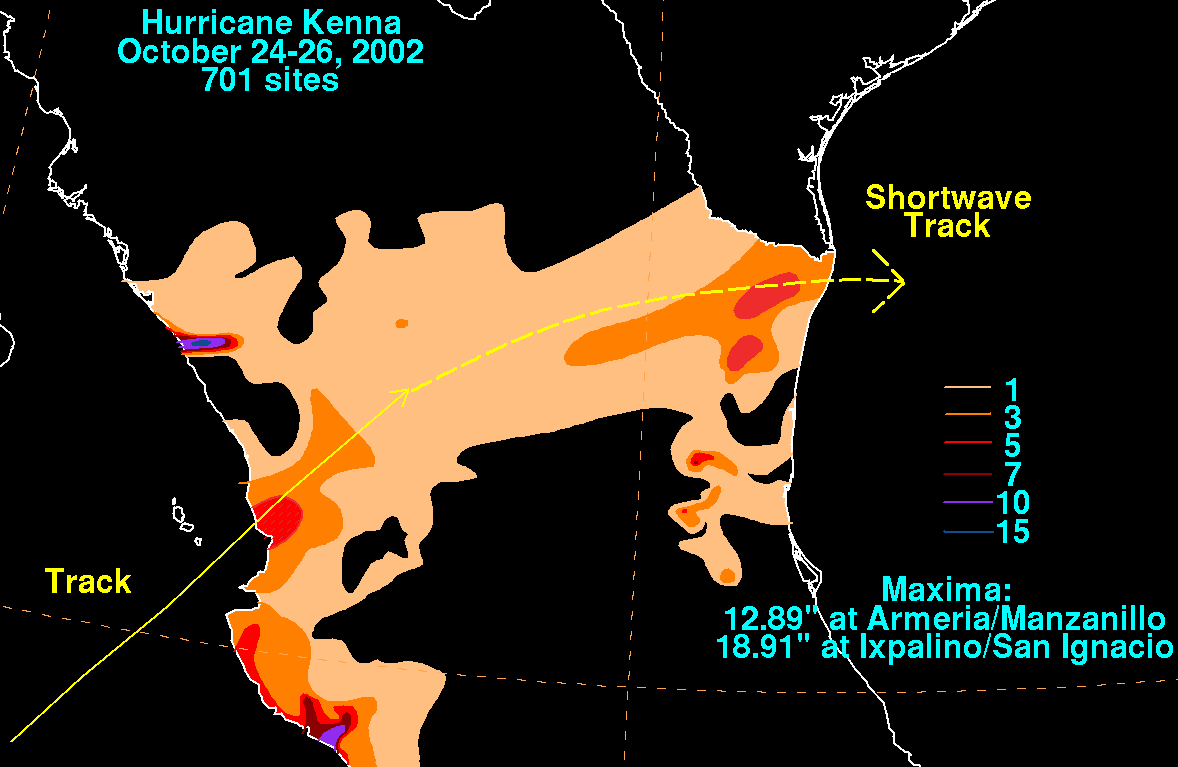
Hurricane Kenna rainfall in Mexico

Few official surface observations are available for the passage of the hurricane. Upon making landfall, Kenna brought an estimated 16 feet (4.9 m) storm surge in San Blas. The surge also affected Puerto Vallarta, with reports of 10 feet (3.0 m) waves rushing inland from the bay. The hurricane dropped about 1.38 inches (35 mm) of precipitation while passing about 60 mi (97 km) east of the offshore archipelago, Islas Marías. There, sustained winds reached an estimated 106 mph (171 km/h). On land, Kenna dropped heavy rainfall peaking at 18.91 inches (480 mm) at San Ignacio, Sinaloa, and 12.89 inches (327 mm) near Manzanillo, Colima. The highest recorded sustained wind on land was about 100 mph (160 km/h) at Tepic, Nayarit, with wind gusts at Puerto Vallarta reaching 50 mph (80 km/h). The hurricane also produced heavy rainfall in Guerrero, Michoacán, Colima, and Jalisco, and hit Baja California Sur with strong winds and rough seas.

There were four deaths related to Kenna. An elderly woman died in San Blas when the wall of her house collapsed on her. In Nayarit, flying debris killed a person in Santiago Escuintla, and two elderly men drowned, one by falling into a river. Both drownings were believed to have been after they fled their homes. In San Blas, strong winds from the hurricane damaged 1,540 houses. Large portions of the city were covered with building debris and sand washed from the ocean. In Santiago Ixcuintla, the hurricane damaged 3,770 homes, and throughout Nayarit, strong winds from the hurricane destroyed the roofs of hundreds of houses. Federal authorities lost communications with at least 30 Indian villages due to the high winds of the hurricane. Kenna destroyed the entire banana, tobacco, and tomato crops in the rural areas of San Blas, Tecuala, and Acaponeta, leaving more than 700 subsistence farmers and their families in need of water and food.

In Puerto Vallarta, about 100 mi (160 km) southeast of the landfall location, Kenna's storm surge damage was estimated around US$5 million, primarily to hotels. Three Puerto Vallarta hotels were extensively damaged, and 150 oceanfront stores were destroyed. The storm surge flooded coastal areas up to 330 feet (100 m) inland. Waist-deep floodwaters swept away or ruined several vehicles. There was also minor damage to the city's port. Puerto Vallarta's oceanfront promenade, the Malecón, was damaged, along with Los Arcos, an arched structure, and In Search of Reason, a sculpture. In San Blas, strong winds from the hurricane damaged 1,540 houses, with dozens of people injured, two seriously. Ten municipalities suffered substantial damage, with insured damage in Mexico totaling US$96 million. Rainfall from the hurricane spread across northern Mexico, causing minor flash floods and mudslides.

The remnants of Kenna first entered southern Texas, before picking up moisture from the Gulf of Mexico. It brought rainfall as far northeast as Kentucky. The heaviest precipitation amounts were near the gulf coast, peaking at 0.562 in (14.28 mm) in Beaumont, Texas. Floodwaters in the city reached 8 ft (2.4 m) deep in underpasses, killing a driver. Several streets across Iberia Parish, Louisiana flooded.

== Aftermath ==
The Mexican government declared the region in Nayarit near the landfall of Kenna as a disaster area, allowing for the usage of emergency funds. Immediately after the passage of the hurricane, the Mexican Red Cross prepared 180 technical staff and volunteers from seven states to deliver 125 t (125,000 kg) of food, medicine, and clothes to the areas most affected. The Mexican government deployed the Mexican Army to the area to remove fallen trees and establish water treatment plants to assist the affected population. The Mexican Navy was sent to assist to support medical personnel in the San Blas area, and the government Department for Family Development assisted the Mexican Red Cross in delivering food. Grupo Modelo, brewers of Corona beer, sent 6,600 US gallons (25,000 litres) of drinking water and 1000 food sets for the San Blas area. Backhoes and dump trucks gradually removed the debris and sand from San Blas. Dozens of storeowners, municipal employees, and volunteers in Puerto Vallarta worked to clear the debris caused by the storm. The remaining stores, bars, and shops placed signs on their windows describing that they were open in an effort to attract the tourists still in the town. By about two months after the hurricane, most hotels, restaurants, and shops were reopened. Puerto Vallarta later rebuilt Los Arcos and In Search of Reason. In November 2002, stagnant waters from Kenna led to a dengue fever outbreak in western Jalisco, which killed two people and hospitalized at least 38 people.

In the spring of 2003, the World Meteorological Organization retired the name Kenna from its rotating eastern Pacific name lists due to the deaths and damage this hurricane caused, and it will never be used again for another tropical cyclone. Kenna was replaced with Karina for the 2008 season.

== See also ==
- List of Mexico hurricanes
- List of Pacific hurricanes
- Hurricane Patricia – The strongest and most intense tropical cyclone ever recorded in the Western Hemisphere, took a nearly identical track in late October 2015.
- Hurricane Willa – A similarly intense Category 5 hurricane that took a nearly identical track in late October 2018.
- Hurricane Lidia (2023) - A powerful hurricane that make landfall at a similar intensity and a similar location.
- Hurricane Otis (2023) - A Category 5 hurricane that made landfall in Acapulco near peak intensity, also initially forecast to remain a tropical storm.
