= Hurricane Liza =

Category 4 Pacific hurricane in 1976

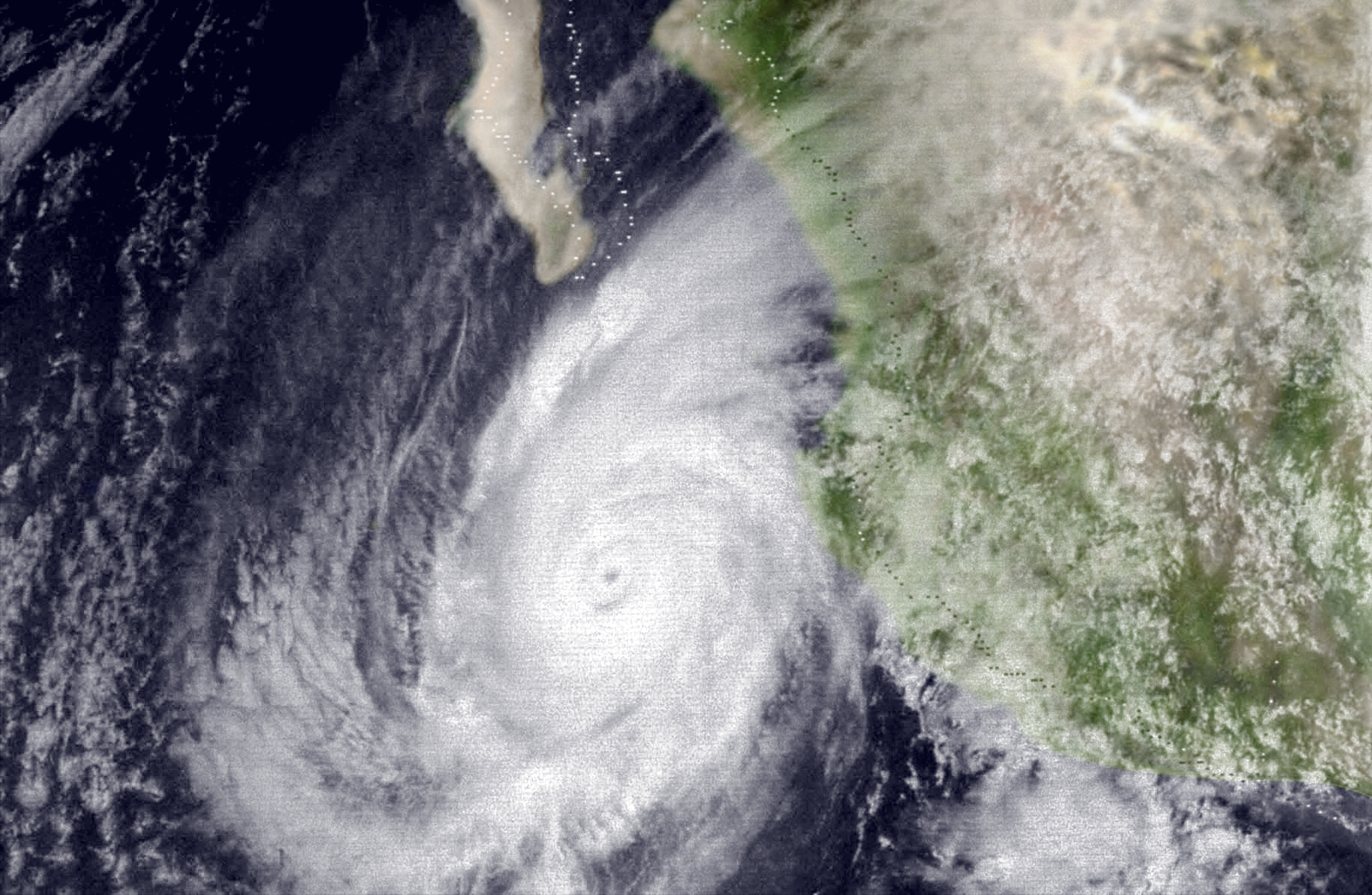
- Hurricane Liza approaching peak intensity on September 29.

Meteorological history
- Formed: September 25, 1976
- Dissipated: October 2, 1976

Category 4 major hurricane
- 1-minute sustained (SSHWS/NWS)
- Highest winds: 140 mph (220 km/h)
- Lowest pressure: 948 mbar (hPa); 27.99 inHg

Overall effects
- Fatalities: 1,263
- Damage: $100 million (1976 USD)
- Areas affected: Baja California Sur; Sinaloa; Sonora; New Mexico; Texas
- IBTrACS
- Part of the 1976 Pacific hurricane season

Hurricane Liza was a powerful, deadly and devastating Pacific hurricane which caused the worst natural disaster in the history of Baja California Sur. The seventeenth tropical cyclone, thirteenth named storm, and eighth hurricane of the 1976 Pacific hurricane season, Liza developed from an area of disturbed weather southwest of the Mexican coast on September 25. Slowly intensifying, the system attained tropical storm strength the following day. In favorable conditions, Liza continued to intensify, reaching hurricane strength on September 28 after developing an eye. The hurricane peaked in intensity as a Category 4 hurricane on the Saffir–Simpson hurricane scale on September 30, with winds of 140 mph (225 km/h) and a minimum barometric pressure of 948 mbar (948 hPa; 28.0 inHg). Liza weakened as it moved northward into the Gulf of California. Shortly thereafter, the hurricane made its second landfall north of Los Mochis, Sinaloa, with winds of 115 mph (185 km/h), making it one of 17 storms to make landfall as major hurricanes in the basin. Inland, the hurricane rapidly weakened and dissipated on October 2.

Prior to the arrival of Liza, residents along the Gulf of California coastline were evacuated, although some refused to leave their homes. Radio stations warned all nearby ships to remain at harbor. Liza brought heavy rainfall to the area, which caused significant flash flooding. Following a dam burst by the El Cajoncito Creek along the outskirts of La Paz, hundreds of people were swept away by flood waters. In La Paz, the capital of the state, 412 people died and 20,000 were left homeless. Nearly one third of the homes in the town were destroyed. Throughout the state, a variety of death tolls were reported, but officials estimated that 1,000 people had perished. In the states of Sinaloa and Sonora, Liza caused moderate damage and left 30,000 to 54,000 homeless, along with 155 more casualties. Along the Gulf of California, 108 people were presumed dead after 12 boats were lost. The remnants of the storm later affected the United States, bringing moderate rainfall

In the aftermath of the storm, rescue workers spent days digging through mud to find victims of the hurricane until the search was disbanded on October 6. The government received criticism for the tragedy, citing that the dam that broke had been poorly built. Overall, at least 1,263 fatalities and $100 million (1976 USD) in damage are attributed to the hurricane, making it one of the deadliest tropical cyclones on record in the eastern Pacific, as well as one of the few Pacific hurricanes to kill more than 1,000 people.

== Meteorological history ==
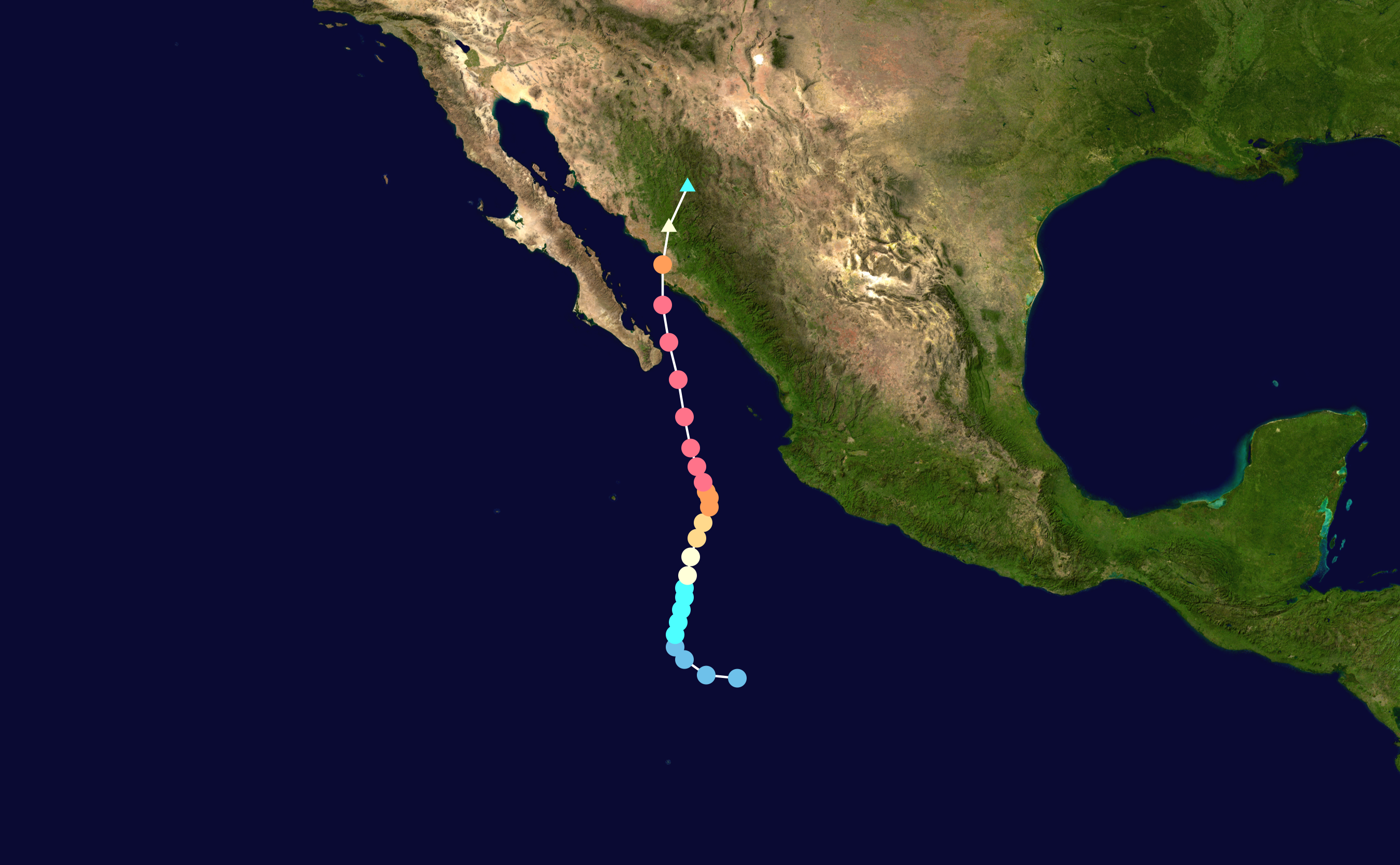
Map plotting the storm's track and intensity, according to the Saffir–Simpson scale Map key Saffir–Simpson scale Tropical depression (≤38 mph, ≤62 km/h) Tropical storm (39–73 mph, 63–118 km/h) Category 1 (74–95 mph, 119–153 km/h) Category 2 (96–110 mph, 154–177 km/h) Category 3 (111–129 mph, 178–208 km/h) Category 4 (130–156 mph, 209–251 km/h) Category 5 (≥157 mph, ≥252 km/h) Unknown Storm type Tropical cyclone Subtropical cyclone Extratropical cyclone, remnant low, tropical disturbance, or monsoon depression

Hurricane Liza originated from a very large area of intense thunderstorms that developed about 400 mi (645 km) southwest of the Mexican coast on September 25. Later that day, satellite imagery indicated that the system had developed a cyclonic circulation. It is estimated that a tropical depression developed at 1800 UTC on September 25, centered about 485 mi (780 km) east-northeast of Zihuatanejo, Guerrero. The depression gradually intensified as it tracked west-northwestward, and became Tropical Storm Liza at 1800 UTC on the following day. Thereafter, Liza turned to the north at 7 mph (11 km/h) and began to strengthen while moving through sea surface temperatures of 85 °F (29 °C). Within 48 hours of the storm's formation, the Eastern Pacific Hurricane Center (EPHC) reported winds of 65 mph (105 km/h), and Liza intensified into a hurricane early on September 28. Around this time, the hurricane had developed an eye that was 17 mi (27 km) in diameter, though it was initially not visible on satellite imagery. Operationally, however, Liza was not upgraded to a hurricane until 18 hours later.

During the afternoon hours of September 28, a Hurricane Hunters aircraft made its first flight into Liza, recording a minimum barometric pressure of 971 mbar (28.7 inHg); despite the low pressure, maximum sustained winds of just 45 mph (70 km/h) were reported. Hours later, a second flight into the hurricane revealed winds of 75 mph (120 km/h) and slightly lower pressures. Liza continued to intensify, attaining winds of 80 mph (130 km/h) by early September 29. Later that morning, the hurricane reached Category 2 intensity on the Saffir-Simpson Hurricane Wind Scale (SSHWS). By midday, Hurricane Hunters recorded a pressure of 948 mb (28.0 inHg) as the eye became visible on infrared satellite imagery, prompting the EPHC to upgrade Liza to a major hurricane, a Category 3 or higher on the SSHWS.

Liza continued to rapidly intensify and attained winds of 140 mph (230 km/h) late on September 29, making it a mid-level Category 4 hurricane. Though Liza encountered warm sea surface temperatures of 88 °F (31 °C), it did not strengthen further the following day. Late on September 30, Liza brushed the Baja California Peninsula, passing about 65 mi (105 km) east of Cabo San Lucas while still at peak intensity. Early on October 1, Liza entered the Gulf of California exactly 52 mi (84 km) east of La Paz, Baja California Sur. By 1300 UTC that day, Liza made landfall about 50 mi (80 km) north of Los Mochis, Sinaloa, with winds of 115 mph (185 km/h), still a Category 3 storm. Operationally, however, Hurricane Liza was estimated to have made landfall with winds of 100 mph (160 km/h) and gusts up to 150 mph (240 km/h). The storm continued quickly inland while weakening, dissipating the following day. The remnants of Hurricane Liza later entered the United States near El Paso, Texas.

== Preparations ==
Prior to the arrival of the hurricane, many residents in shanty towns failed to hear tropical cyclone warnings and watches. Some did hear the warnings, but they did not believe them as the same warning had been issued several weeks before and nothing had happened. In addition, city officials warned the residents living near the dam to take shelter in public buildings though most refused to leave. The government ignored all requests to shore up an earthen dam, as they did not believe Liza would pose a significant threat of damage to the Baja California Peninsula. Along the Gulf Coast, troops evacuated residents, and radio stations warned all nearby ships to remain at harbor. During the afternoon hours of September 29, the education department suspended classes as it began to rain.

As the remnants of Liza moved across the western United States, National Weather Service posted flash flood watches for much of deserts of California, southern Utah, and a portion of Colorado. For the higher areas of Colorado, a snow watch was in effect. In addition, motorists were warned of very hazards driving conditions within 100 mi (160 km) of the border.

== Impact ==
In all, Liza brought a total of $100 million in damage in Baja California Sur, which receives catastrophic flooding from hurricanes every 50 years or so. The hurricane was considered the worst natural disaster in the history of the peninsula, which at the time had a population of 130,000. It was also at the time considered the worst hurricane to affect the entire country in the 20th century.

=== Baja California Sur ===
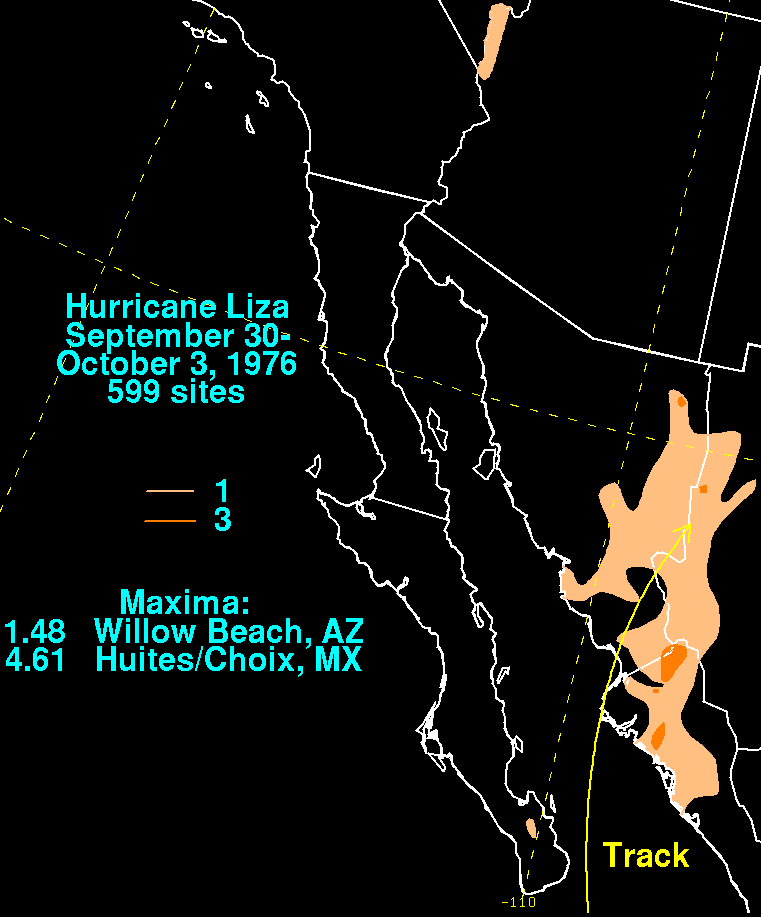
Rainfall totals associated with Liza

Hurricane Liza caused extensive damage and loss of life in the Mexican state of Baja California Sur. Although the Hydrometeorological Prediction Center (HPC) suggests that Liza brought only light to moderate rains to the area, peaking at around 1 in (25 mm), newspaper accounts claim that 11.8 in (300 mm) fell (more than a year's worth of rainfall) in some areas in a mere 3 hours. Moreover, 22 in (559 mm) was measured in El Triunfo and San Antonio, along the southern portion of the peninsula. In La Paz, Baja California Sur, a storm surge of 8 ft (2.4 m) was reported.

The El Cajoncito Creek along the extreme southeast portion of the state grew into a raging torrent. During night of October 1, waters burst a three-year-old and 30 ft (9.1 m) dike. A 5 ft (1.5 m) wall of water spilled over a small shanty town of 10,000 inhabitantes, thousands of whom lived in cardboard shacks. Some shacks were swept 6 mi (9.7 km) away from their initial location. The ensuing mudslide is regarded as the worst in the history of Mexico. Most of the deaths from the hurricane were due to the dam failure; streets also received flooding from the dam burst.

Initially, government officials denied that the dam was poorly built; many politicians and an engineer for the nation's water company blamed the dam's poor construction as the source of the extreme death toll. Prior to the arrival of the storm, many residents had repeatedly requested that a stone wall be built to protect their homes. After the storm, they said that the deaths could have been prevented. According to one account, two master planned communities were situated in the middle of the drainage and were thus deluged by the storm. The water department head took the blame for the construction, but also said that the disaster was a natural phenomenon.

"Dozens" of people were also swept away into the Gulf of California when Hurricane Liza destroyed a 600 ft (185 m) sea wall, which, ironically, had been built to prevent flooding from such storms. Nine children got swept under mud. The highway that connected Baja California with California was also destroyed in many places, more than originally anticipated. In fact, there were holes in the asphalt pavement. Bridges up to 600 ft (185 m) long were twisted.

Due to flooding, troops evacuated dozens of communities along the Gulf coast. Many desert communities throughout the state were left without any telephone or electrical service; wood, tarpaper, and cardboard were all scattered. Dozens of scores of huts were destroyed. Many humans were swept into the gulf. Sixteen people died inside the remains of a building. Moreover, the Piojillo river overflowed its banks, killing many people and resulting in considerable damage. Elsewhere, destruction was reported in San Jose del Cabo, Cabo San Lucas, San Lucas, and Puntas Arena; Pichilinague also received moderate damage. However, there are no known reports of any casualties in all four of those places. Hurricane Liza was also one of six hurricane to directly impact Los Cabos.

South of La Paz, communications and telephone services were cut off to 13 smaller communities. A highway that extends as far south as Cabo San Lucas was blocked. Further north, a highway that links La Paz to places along the northern part of the peninsula such as Mexicali were badly damaged in four places. Offshore, officials reported that 75 boats including nine owned by Americans had sunk during the hurricane. Most notably, the ship Salvatierra's cabin and most of its upper deck were ripped off while its hull rolled over. Multiple trucks smashed the ship; however, they were later salvaged. In addition, an 88 ft (27 m) vessel sunk during the storm, in which the owner had to pay for the damage, but later earned $50,000 settlement. Overall, several ports along the coast were destroyed by the storm.

In La Paz, a city that at that time had a population of approximately 85,000, some 20,000 were left homeless (nearly one third of the city's population), and an additional 4,000 were injured. It is estimated that one out of five homes were destroyed in the city. Widespread flooding was reported throughout the city with mud filling up the first floor of many houses. This flash flooding led to many homes and automobiles being destroyed. Several roofs fell off of homes and landed deep in the mud. Many roads were blocked due to fallen trees while numerous homes were pushed off their foundation; some cars were also abandoned when Hurricane Liza struck. Some cars were reportedly piled against damaged building and debris. Nine people died when a car was swept away in the floodwaters.

Also, electrical lines and drinking water supplies were cut in La Paz. Also, communication lines were extensively damaged. La Paz Airport received damage during the hurricane; however, by the afternoon of October 1, the airport re-opened, thus allowing the military to provide much-needed aid to victims. Wood, tarpaper, and cardboard were all scattered throughout La Paz. By October 2, rescue teams had covered 38 sq mi (100 sq km) to configure the damage. Throughout the city, a total of 412 people had been killed, 150 were missing people within the resort city, five of which were later presumed dead. Overall, nearly a third of the houses in La Paz were leveled.

A wide variety of death tolls were reported by many different sources. Mexican president Luis Echeverria as well as the HPC and EPHC claimed that 435 people died during the hurricane. It was initially stated that 630 people had died during the storm; however, this total does not include victims discovered by the Mexican army. During the afternoon of October 2, the local government had placed the confirmed death toll at 397. Two days later, the Bangor Daily News reported that the number of bodies found dead ranged from 400 to 750. By late October 3, Mexican officials and a Red Cross spokesperson reported that 650 bodies had been found. Meanwhile, a military search operation claimed that the death toll of the hurricane was 1,050. By October 6, local officials had abandoned efforts to retrieve additional bodies, citing safety reasons. Even though 650 people were confirmed to have died during Hurricane Liza, officials estimated that at least 1,000 people died. Within a week after Hurricane Liza, some feared 10,000 people perished. In addition, some modern estimates suggest that the toll could have been as high as 7,000.

The Red Cross estimated that 75% of the deaths from the storm were children under 12. At first, most of the bodies found by the army were buried normally though due to the high death toll, some were just buried under debris. Some dead bodies were later burned to prevent disease. According to preliminary estimates by officials, 40,000 people were made homeless and an addition 20,000 were injured, 126 of which were considered significant. Within another day, the homeless total rose to 70,000. Total damage from the hurricane was estimated at $100 million (1976 USD).

=== Sinaloa ===
In the state of Sinaloa, heavy rainfall was recorded along the northern portion of the state near the Sonoran border. A peak total of 4.61 in (117 mm) was measured in both Hultes and Choix. Upon making landfall in the state, Liza became one of six tropical system to making landfall in the state at tropical storm intensity during the 1968-1995 time frame. Offshore Topolobampo, 12 ship boats were reported missing, and the 108 crewman were feared dead. On the mainland, some damage was reported. Some flooding was recorded and at least 1,000 homes were evacuated. In Los Mochis alone, 4,000 people were left without a home. Damage in the city totaled $300,000.

=== Sonora ===
Across Sonora, many homes were wrecked due to flooding. Light rainfall up to 1 in (25 mm) was recorded along the southeastern region of the state which led to reports of damage. In Navojoa, heavy damage was reported. Numerous faculty homes, as well as the school barn and dining hall lost their homes at the College of the Pacific. Damage totaled to $300,000. Along the southern portion of the state, in Yavaros, 155 people died, mostly adults. Roughly 80% of the town was flooded; it would take three years for the town to recover fully.

About 30,000 people were left homeless statewide though other authorities estimated that 24,000 people were left homeless in both Sonora and Sinaloa combined. Throughout the mainland, 12 communities sustained heavy damage. In all, all, there are no reports of major damage in the mainland.

=== Southwestern United States ===
During its demise, Liza brought heavy rains and flooding to much of the Southwestern United States. In Arizona, the tropical system brought light to moderate rain throughout the state, with maximum being 1.48 inches (38 mm) at Willow Beach, Arizona. Further east, Liza's remnants dropped light rainfall in New Mexico (peaking at 0.47 in (12 mm) in White Sands National Park), as well as in southwestern Texas. Across Death Valley, flooding was recorded.

== Aftermath ==
Known Pacific hurricanes that have killed at least 100 people
Hurricane	Season	Fatalities	Ref.
"Mexico"	1959	1,800	
Paul	1982	1,625	
Liza	1976	1,263	
Tara	1961	436	
Pauline	1997	230–400	
Agatha	2010	204	
Manuel	2013	169	
Tico	1983	141	
Ismael	1995	116	
"Lower California"	1931	110	
"Mazatlán"	1943	100	
Lidia	1981	100	

During the aftermath of the storm, rescue workers searched the La Paz harbor, but had little hope in finding any victims. Other rescue workers endured 100 °F (38 °C) heat while frantically searching for bodies floating on the ocean or sunk under mud. Six bulldozers worked all day and night to extract cars, some of which were upside down while others were submerged into the flood waters. Officials estimated that it would take eight days to repair down power lines in La Paz and completely restore electrical services; within 72 hours following the passage of Liza, there was no electricity or fresh water access to survivors. Emergency facilitates were used to provide the city with drinking water. Food was rationed at hotels and restaurants. Drinking water was supplied, but water supplies rapidly went short.

Some survivors of Hurricane Liza complained that they had only received one ration of food and water within 3 days of the passage of Liza. Subsequently, armed troops guarded gangs of looters that damaged additional homes. An effort was made to cure people who were suffering from sickness, but by midday on October 3, after treating more than 5,000 persons, the effort had been halted due to a lack of sterile cotton vital for administrating the shots. Medical workers attempted to vaccinate all survivors for typhoid fever and tetanus, but the supply of syringes ran short. A large memorial service was held on October 2 in a nearby church.

Supplies had been brought in through the air and via the Mexican Navy containing food, blankets, and medicine early on October 2. However, additional bad weather initially prevented further supplies from coming in. Around that time, President Echeverria ordered emergency aid to be sent La Paz, Los Mochis, and Ciudad Obregón, as well as three coastal Sonoran ports. In addition, officials set up tents to house 40,000 homeless persons. Meanwhile, city officials appealed for additional food, medicine, and construction materials. Gerald Ford, who was then the U.S. president, agreed to provide aid for victims of Hurricane Liza; the first of which arrived late on October 2, containing food and construction materials. The next day, power had been restored to hospitals, government centers, and gas stations. The government said that it was rushing in 100,000 meals as well as 40,000 temporary shelters the first of which started to arrive on October 5. within a week after the storm, however, one survivor of the storm noted that plenty of food had arrived from many places.

Ángel César Mendoza Arámburo, the governor of Baja California Sur, ordered a permanent evacuation of all low-lying residents to prevent more destruction during future floods, saying "I never want to see this city menaced in this way again". State and federal officials arranged a meeting on October 3 to make a plan to reconstruct the devastated area, which had to be almost entirely re-built. President Echeverría declared that La Paz would be built a different way. In February 1977, houses were donated to the needy in La Paz. On the mainland, $50,000 of relief materials as well as $20,000 of cash was supplied to the Los Mochis area.

Many La Paz residents were upset with officials for failing to protect the dam. Months later, the Mexican government launched an investigation into its failure.

== See also ==
- List of Category 4 Pacific hurricanes
- List of Baja California Peninsula hurricanes
- List of Pacific hurricanes
- Hurricane Norbert (2008)
- Hurricane Jimena (2009)
- Hurricane Odile
