= 1959 Mexico hurricane =

Category 4 Pacific hurricane in 1959

Hurricane Fifteen
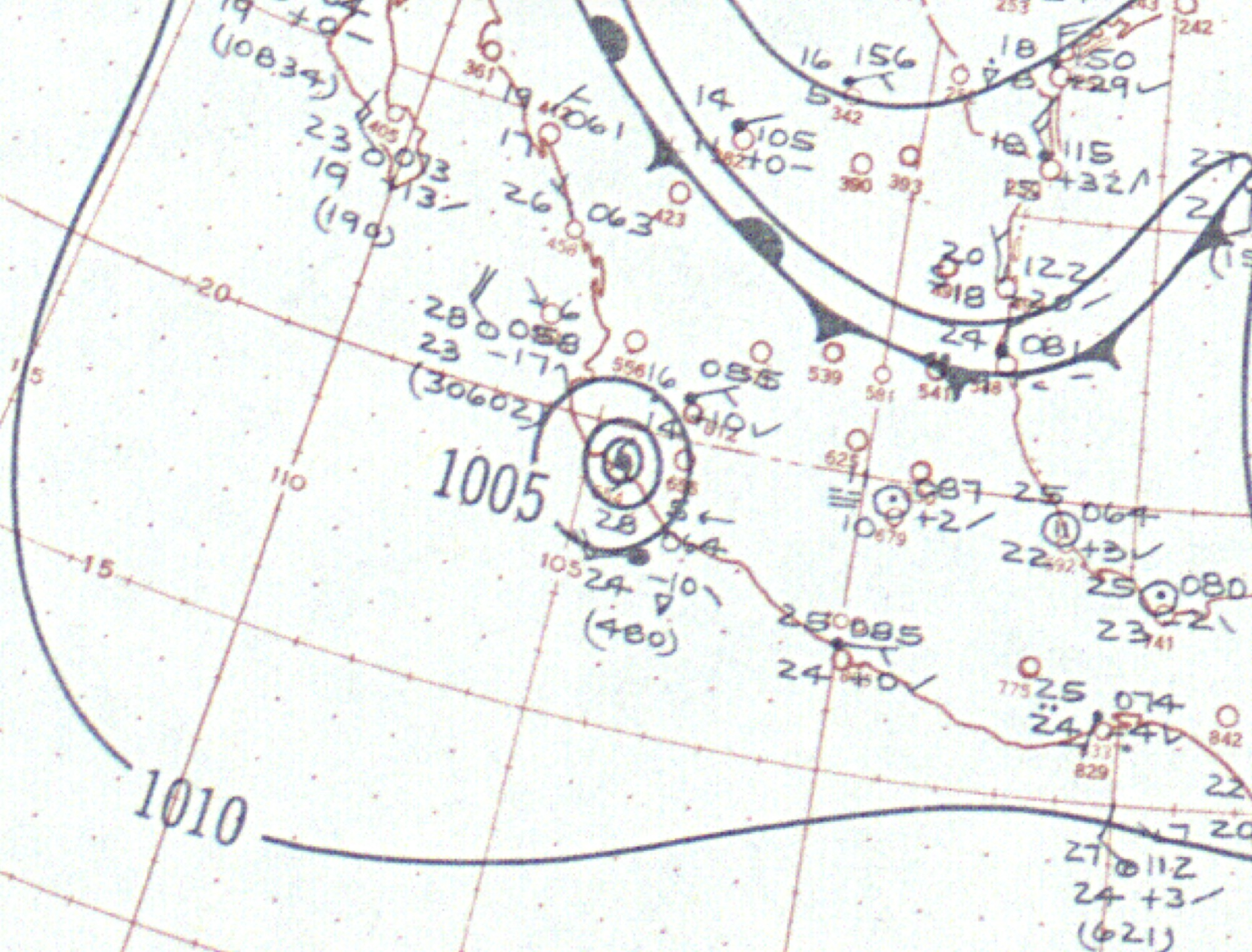
- Surface weather analysis of the hurricane on October 27

Meteorological history
- Formed: October 22, 1959
- Dissipated: October 28, 1959

Category 4 major hurricane
- 1-minute sustained (SSHWS/NWS)
- Highest winds: 140 mph (220 km/h)
- Lowest pressure: 955 mbar (hPa); 28.20 inHg

Overall effects
- Fatalities: 1,800 total (Deadliest East Pacific hurricane)
- Damage: ≥$280 million (1959 USD)
- Areas affected: Colima and Jalisco, much of western Mexico
- IBTrACS
- Part of the 1959 Pacific hurricane season

The 1959 Mexico hurricane was the deadliest Pacific hurricane on record. First observed south of Mexico on October 23, the cyclone tracked northwestward. It intensified into a Category 3 hurricane on October 25 and reached Category 4 intensity on the following day. After turning toward the northeast, the hurricane made landfall in Mexico near Manzanillo, Colima, at peak intensity. The system continued on that trajectory before dissipating on the next day.

Impact from the hurricane was severe and widespread. Initially forecast to remain offshore, the system curved northeast and moved ashore, becoming one of Mexico's worst natural disasters at the time. Up to 150 boats were submerged. Countless homes in Colima and Jalisco were damaged or destroyed, large portions of the states were inaccessible by flash flooding, and hundreds of residents were stranded. All coconut plantations were blown down during the storm, leaving thousands without work and instating fear that it would take the economy years to recover. Torrential rainfall across mountain terrain contributed to numerous mudslides that caused hundreds of fatalities. In the aftermath of the cyclone, convoys delivering aid were hindered by the destruction. Residents were vaccinated to prevent the spread of disease. Overall, the hurricane inflicted at least $280 million (1959 USD) in damage.

== Meteorological history ==
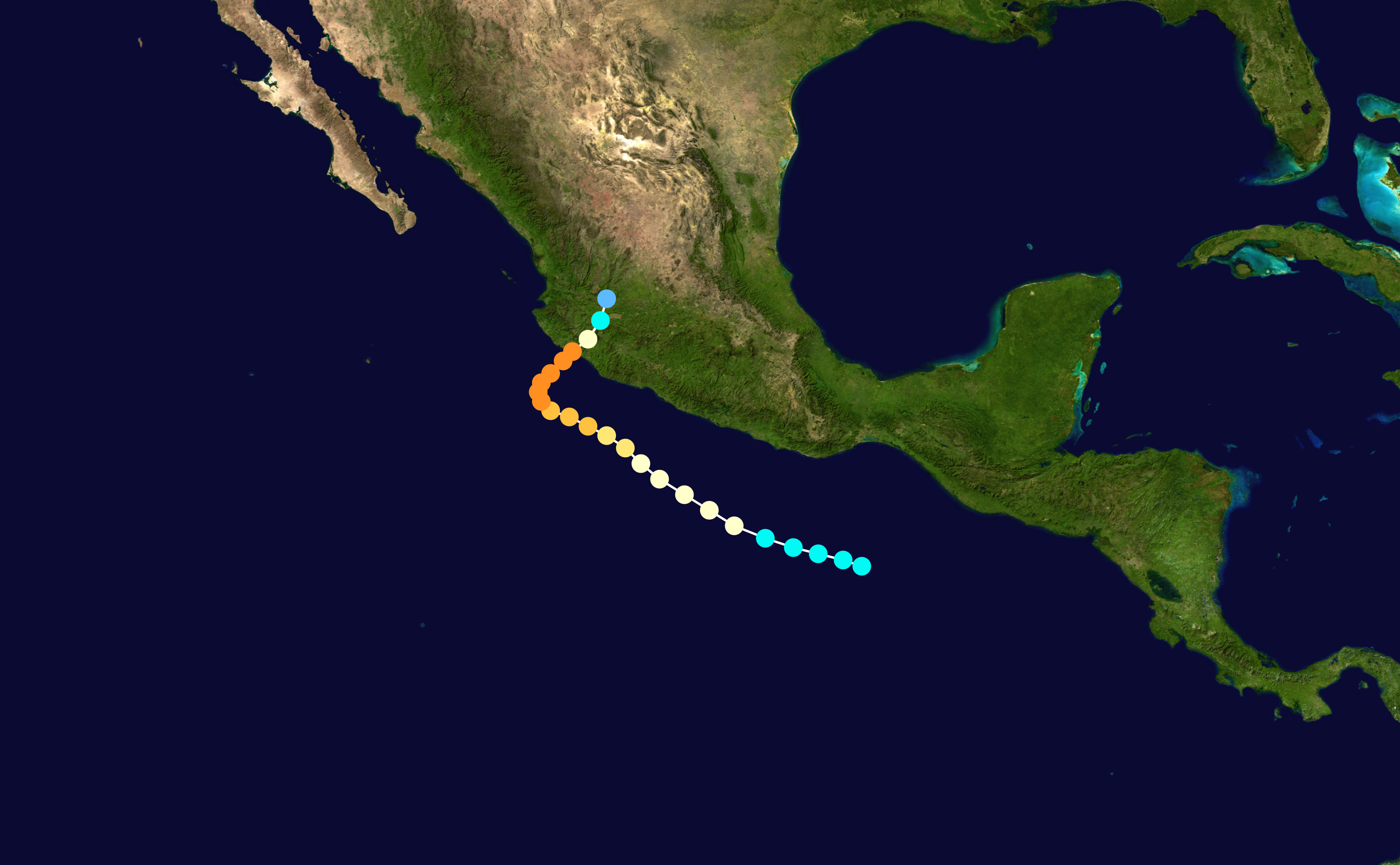
Map plotting the storm's track and intensity, according to the Saffir–Simpson scale Map key Saffir–Simpson scale Tropical depression (≤38 mph, ≤62 km/h) Tropical storm (39–73 mph, 63–118 km/h) Category 1 (74–95 mph, 119–153 km/h) Category 2 (96–110 mph, 154–177 km/h) Category 3 (111–129 mph, 178–208 km/h) Category 4 (130–156 mph, 209–251 km/h) Category 5 (≥157 mph, ≥252 km/h) Unknown Storm type Tropical cyclone Subtropical cyclone Extratropical cyclone, remnant low, tropical disturbance, or monsoon depression

On October 22, a low pressure area was present south of the Gulf of Tehuantepec, having originated out of an area of disturbed weather in the region the day before. That day, two ships reported gale-force winds, suggesting that a tropical storm formed by 12:00 UTC. Moving west-northwestward parallel to the southwest coast of Mexico, the system steadily intensified, reaching hurricane status by late on October 23. The storm continued to intensify, although there were few ships in the path to record the intensity until October 26. During that time, interpolation of observations suggests that the storm attained major hurricane intensity – a Category 3 on the modern Saffir–Simpson scale – with winds of 115 mph (185 km/h) on October 25.

On October 26, the hurricane turned abruptly to the northeast toward the Mexican coast. At 00:00 UTC on October 27, a nearby ship recorded winds of 130 km/h (81 mph), confirming the increase in intensity. Six hours later, another ship recorded winds of 115 mph (185 km/h). At around 12:00 UTC on October 27, the hurricane made landfall just northwest of Manzanillo, Colima, with an eye 13 mi (21 km) in diameter. The Mary Barbara – a ship in Manzanillo Harbor – estimated winds of 155 mph (249 km/h), which was the basis for the previous estimated landfall intensity of 160 mph (260 km/h), which was later determined to be an overestimate. The same ship reported a minimum barometric pressure of 958 mbar (28.3 inHg) in the southeastern periphery of the eyewall; this, in conjunction with other nearby readings, suggested a minimum central pressure of 955 mbar (28.2 inHg). Based largely on the central pressure, the 2016 reanalysis concluded the hurricane's peak intensity at landfall was 140 mph (220 km/h), based on uncertainties in the wind estimates, the central pressure, as well as the storm's small size and slow movement. The hurricane rapidly weakened over the mountainous terrain of southwestern Mexico. Within 12 hours of landfall, the system weakened to tropical storm status, and on October 28, the storm dissipated.

== Impact ==
Known Pacific hurricanes that have killed at least 100 people
Hurricane	Season	Fatalities	Ref.
"Mexico"	1959	1,800	
Paul	1982	1,625	
Liza	1976	1,263	
Tara	1961	436	
Pauline	1997	230–400	
Agatha	2010	204	
Manuel	2013	169	
Tico	1983	141	
Ismael	1995	116	
"Lower California"	1931	110	
"Mazatlán"	1943	100	
Lidia	1981	100	

Thousands of people were unprepared for the storm. Thus, the system was dubbed "a sneak hurricane". After passing well offshore from Acapulco, it was forecast to head out to sea. Instead, it recurved eastward and made landfall.

The hurricane had devastating effects on the places it hit. It killed at least 1,000 people directly, and a total of 1,800 people. At that time, it was Mexico's worst natural disaster in recent times. Most of the destruction was in Colima and Jalisco. A preliminary estimate of property damage was $280 million (1959 USD).

The storm sank three merchant ships, and two other vessels. On one ship, the Sinaloa, 21 of 38 hands went down. On another, the El Caribe, all hands were lost. As many as 150 total boats were sunk.

A quarter of the homes in Cihuatlán, Jalisco, were totally destroyed, leaving many homeless. In Manzanillo, Colima, 40 percent of all homes were destroyed, and four ships in the harbor were sunk. Large portions of Colima and Jalisco were isolated by flooding. Hundreds of people were stranded. Minatitlán, Colima, suffered especially, as 800 people out of its population of 1000 were dead or missing, according to a message sent to President Adolfo López Mateos. In Colima, all coconut plantations were blown down and thousands of people were left out of work. That state's economy was damaged enough that officials thought it would take years to recover.

The hurricane also dumped heavy rains along its path. This water-logged the hills near Minatitlán, and contributed to the huge mudslide late on October 29 that claimed 800 victims. The slide uncovered hundreds of venomous scorpions and snakes, which killed tens more people in the aftermath. Additional hordes of scorpions were driven from their nests when the adobe walls crumbled away. Governor of Colima Rodolfo Chávez Carrillo and his wife issued a plea for venom inoculations afterwards. In some places, the mud was 10 feet (3.0 m) deep. Water supplies were badly polluted, both by debris and dead bodies.

== Aftermath ==
In the aftermath, air rescue operations were conducted, but the destruction of roads in the area hindered convoys carrying aid. Planes also made supply drops, but rescue operations were hindered by broken roads and rails. Survivors were vaccinated against typhoid and tetanus. Part of Manzanillo was placed under quarantine.

== See also ==
- Hurricane Madeline (1976) – one of the strongest landfalling Pacific hurricanes
- Hurricane Patricia – the strongest Pacific hurricane on record, taking a similar path in 2015
