= Hurricane Odile =

Category 4 Pacific hurricane in 2014

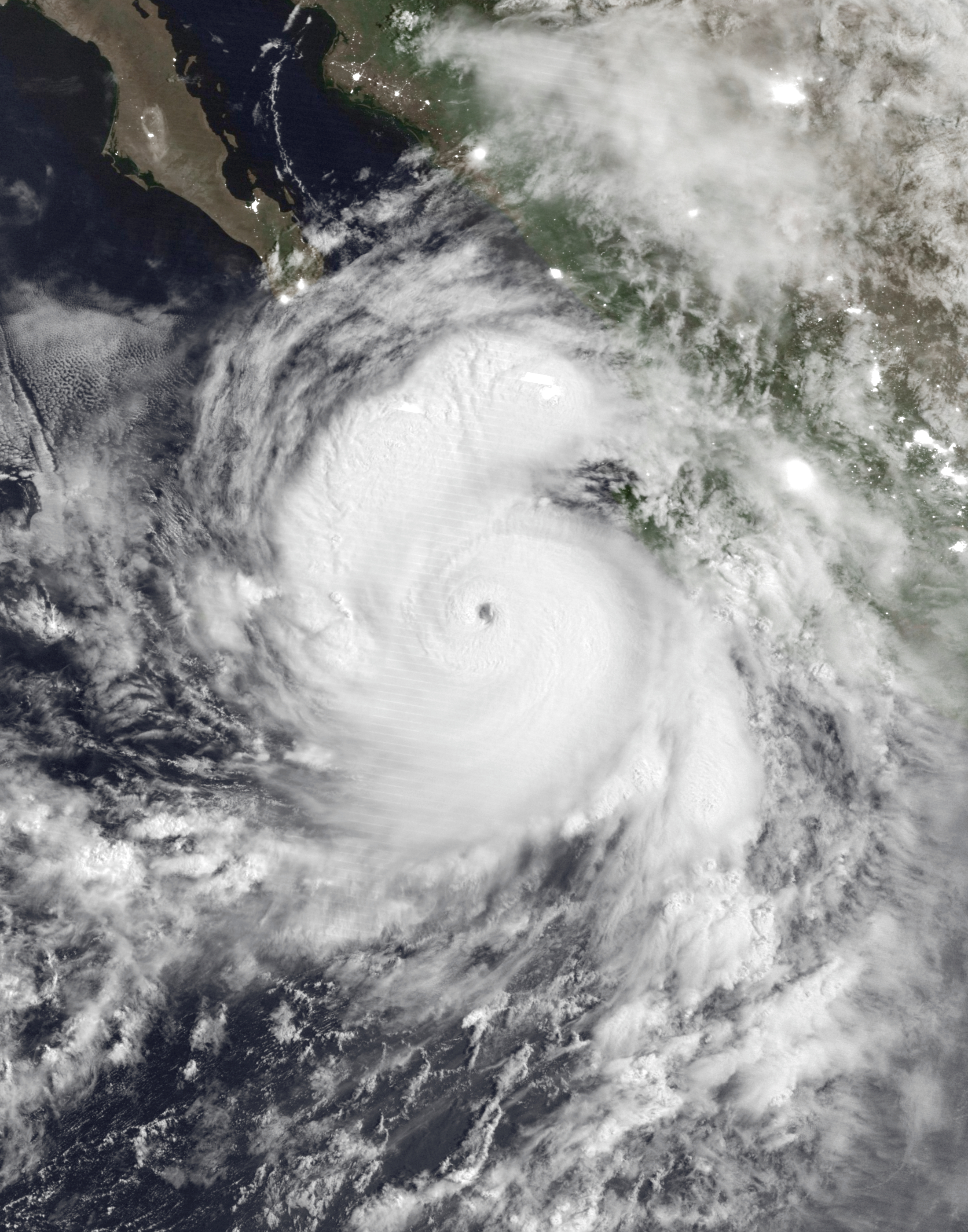
- Hurricane Odile approaching the Baja California peninsula on September 14

Meteorological history
- Formed: September 10, 2014
- Remnant low: September 18, 2014
- Dissipated: September 19, 2014

Category 4 major hurricane
- 1-minute sustained (SSHWS/NWS)
- Highest winds: 140 mph (220 km/h)
- Lowest pressure: 918 mbar (hPa); 27.11 inHg

Overall effects
- Fatalities: 18 total
- Damage: $1.82 billion (2014 USD)(Fifth-costliest Pacific hurricane on record)
- Areas affected: Mexico; Southwestern United States
- IBTrACS
- Part of the 2014 Pacific hurricane season

Hurricane Odile was a powerful and destructive Pacific hurricane that is tied for the most intense landfalling tropical cyclone in the Baja California Peninsula during the satellite era. Odile inflicted widespread damage, particularly in the Mexico state of Baja California Sur, in addition to causing lesser impacts on the Mexican mainland and Southwestern United States. The precursor to Odile developed into a tropical depression south of Mexico on September 10 and quickly reached tropical storm strength. After meandering for several days, Odile began to track northwestward, intensifying to hurricane status before rapidly reaching its Category 4 hurricane peak intensity on September 14. The cyclone weakened to a Category 3 hurricane before making landfall near Cabo San Lucas with winds of 125 mph (205 km/h). Odile gradually weakened as it tracked across the length of the Baja California Peninsula, briefly crossing into the Gulf of California before degenerating into a remnant system on September 17. These remnants tracked northeastward across the Southwestern United States before they were no longer identifiable on September 19.

Initially, the National Hurricane Center (NHC) forecast that Odile would track westward and avoid land as it would curve out to sea. Accordingly, the local governments of southwestern Mexico initially posted minor weather alerts. Precautionary measures on the Baja California Peninsula began in earnest after Odile unexpectedly took a direct course towards the peninsula. Several municipalities declared a state of emergency, opening 164 shelters with a total capacity of 30,000 people. Due to the unanticipated threat of Odile, approximately 26,000 foreign tourists were stranded on the peninsula at the time of landfall.

In Odile's developmental stage, its heavy rainfall and storm surge inflicted minor coastal damage across southwestern Mexico and three deaths in Oaxaca and Jalisco. The most significant storm impacts occurred on the Baja California Peninsula. Power outages spurred by Odile's intense winds and rain cut electricity to 92% of the population of Baja California Sur. Severe flooding also occurred, causing rivers to swell and the mass evacuation of people out of hazardous low-lying areas. The remnants of Odile brought rains and unseasonably powerful thunderstorms to the southwestern United States. In all, Odile led to the deaths of 18 people throughout its nine-day existence, and caused a damage amounted to Mex$24.2 billion (US$1.82 billion). (Note: All currencies are in their 2014 values and are converted to United States dollars using data from the International Monetary Fund published by the World Bank.)

== Meteorological history ==
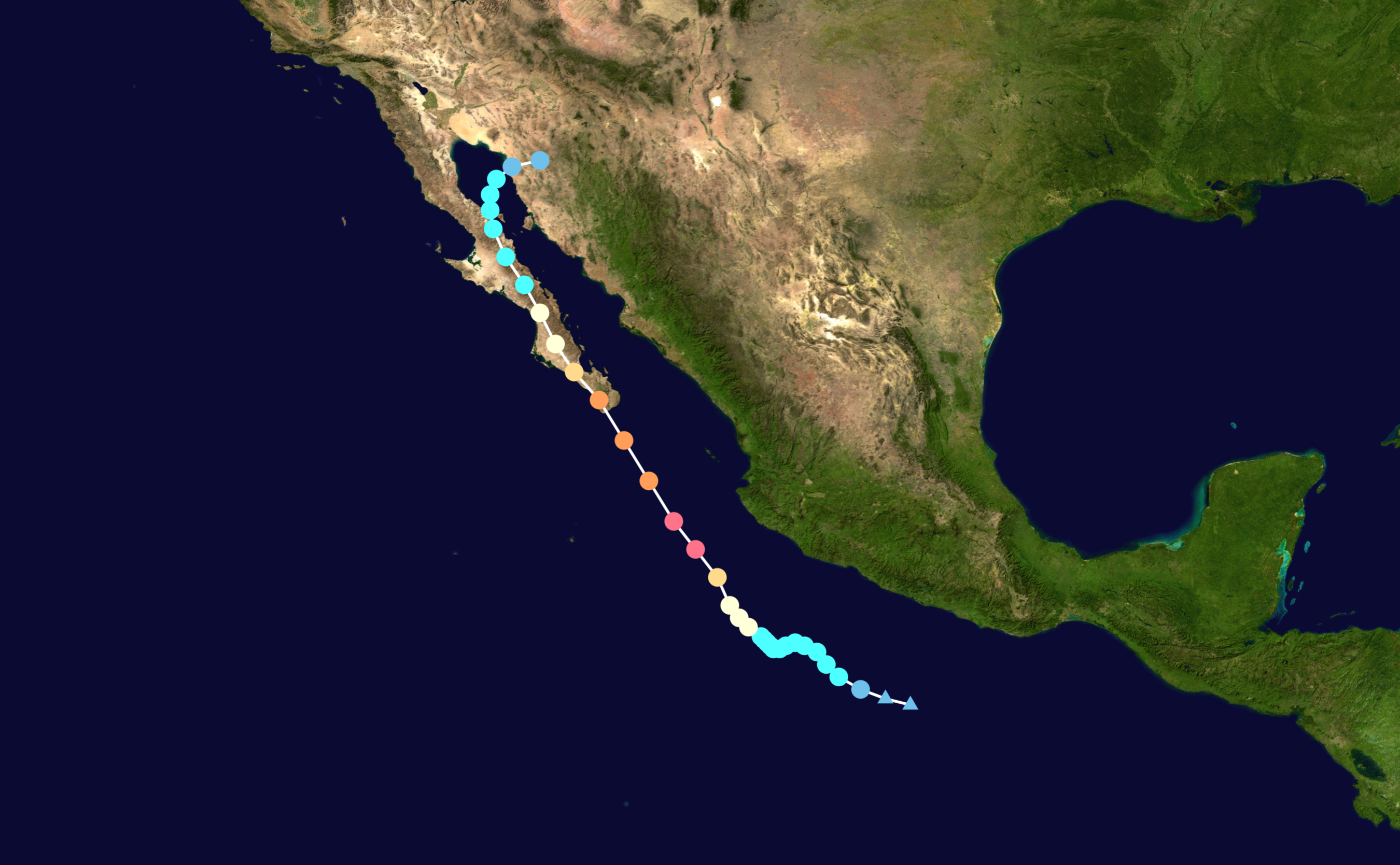
Map plotting the storm's track and intensity, according to the Saffir–Simpson scale Map key Saffir–Simpson scale Tropical depression (≤38 mph, ≤62 km/h) Tropical storm (39–73 mph, 63–118 km/h) Category 1 (74–95 mph, 119–153 km/h) Category 2 (96–110 mph, 154–177 km/h) Category 3 (111–129 mph, 178–208 km/h) Category 4 (130–156 mph, 209–251 km/h) Category 5 (≥157 mph, ≥252 km/h) Unknown Storm type Tropical cyclone Subtropical cyclone Extratropical cyclone, remnant low, tropical disturbance, or monsoon depression

Hurricane Odile originated from a tropical wave that exited the African Coast on August 28. Shower activity along the wave axis remained poorly organized until it crossed Central America on September 3. On the next day, the National Hurricane Center (NHC) indicated the possibility for this wave to develop into a low-pressure area south of Mexico and later a tropical cyclone. By September 7, a large area of thunderstorms developed in association with the wave; the broad system slowly progressed westward and gradually organized over the next few days. At 00:00 UTC on September 9, a surface low developed roughly 265 mi (425 km) south-southeast of Acapulco. This low became better defined over the next 24 hours as it tracked northwestward; the NHC determined that the disturbance had become sufficiently organized to be classified as a tropical depression at 00:00 UTC on September 10. A continued increase in thunderstorms and organization prompted the NHC to upgrade the system to tropical storm status six hours after formation, designating the system with the name Odile.

Further intensification was slowed because of strong wind shear, which caused the storm's center of circulation to be displaced from the bulk of convection. Due to the lack of atmospheric steering currents at the time, Odile assumed a slow, meandering course towards the west. Continued wind shear caused the tropical storm to become disorganized on September 11 before abating on September 12, allowing for thunderstorms to rebuild over Odile's circulation center. The relaxed wind shear enabled the growth of intense rainbands encircling the tropical cyclone as well as improved outflow aloft. The following day, Odile quickly attained a large central dense overcast; in accordance with Dvorak-derived satellite intensity estimates, the NHC upgraded the storm to hurricane intensity.

Most intense Pacific hurricanes
Rank	Hurricane	Season	Pressure	
Rank	Hurricane	Season	hPa	inHg
1	5 Patricia	2015	872	25.75
2	5 Polo	2026	892	26.34
3	5 Linda	1997	902	26.64
4	5 Rick	2009	906	26.76
5	5 Kenna	2002	913	26.96
6	5 Ava	1973	915	27.02
6	5 Ioke	2006	915	27.02
8	5 Marie	2014	918	27.11
8	4 Odile	2014	918	27.11
10	5 Guillermo	1997	919	27.14
Listing is only for tropical cyclones in the Pacific Ocean north of the equator and east of the International Dateline

Upon being classified as a hurricane on September 13, Odile began to accelerate towards the north-northwest in the direction of the Baja California Peninsula under the influence of both a strengthening mid-level ridge over the Gulf of Mexico and an upper-level low to the northwest. Following the formation of an eye, Odile began a phase of rapid intensification. Odile attained Category 2 intensity on the Saffir–Simpson hurricane wind scale at 00:00 UTC on September 14. Six hours later, the cyclone had reached Category 4 intensity with maximum sustained winds of 140 mph (220 km/h) and a minimum barometric pressure of 918 mbar (hPa; 27.11 inHg), a pressure typical for a Category 5 hurricane. At the time, this pressure reading was tied for the sixth-lowest on record for an east Pacific hurricane. Even though additional deepening was forecast, strengthening leveled off thereafter as an eyewall replacement cycle, common in intense hurricanes, began to run its course. Despite the leveling off in intensity, a United States Air Force aircraft reconnaissance flight observed a barometric pressure of 922 mbar (hPa; 27.23 inHg); this measurement was the lowest pressure reading officially measured throughout Odile's existence. Nonetheless, the eroding of the hurricane's inner core due to the eyewall replacement cycle resulted in gradual weakening after peak intensity. Still maintaining its north-northwesterly course with little deviation, Odile made landfall near Cabo San Lucas at 04:45 UTC on September 15 with winds of 125 mph (205 km/h) and a central pressure of 941 mbar (hPa; 27.79 inHg). The wind estimates tie Odile with Hurricane Olivia in 1967 as the strongest tropical cyclone to move ashore Baja California Sur in the satellite era.

Despite the presence of land, only gradual weakening occurred initially after Odile made landfall. However, a combination of increasingly southwesterly wind shear and the Baja California Peninsula's mountainous terrain began to take its toll on the hurricane, weakening it to a tropical storm by September 16. Although the storm's convection was thinning out, Odile retained a well-organized satellite appearance and occasional bursts of thunderstorm activity. On September 17, a nearby mid-level ridge steered the system slowly northeastward, moving Odile into the Gulf of California as a moderate tropical storm. Despite the very warm waters, the emergence of wind shear and land interaction offset otherwise favorable conditions. Odile continued to weaken as its convection sped northeastwards into Mexico and the southwestern United States. After turning northward and then northeastward in response to a mid-latitude trough, Odile moved inland over the northern part of the Mexican state of Sonora about near Alvaro Obregón as a marginal tropical storm. By doing so, Odile became the first tropical storm to make landfall north of 30°N in Mexico since Hurricane Nora of 1997. At 21:00 UTC on September 17, the NHC determined that the tropical storm had degenerated into a remnant area of low-pressure inland over northwestern mainland Mexico. The remnant circulation of Odile continued to track northeastward, entering extreme southeastern Arizona by 09:00 UTC on September 18. This circulation dissipated by September 19, just east of the border between Arizona and New Mexico, leaving behind a marked mass of thunderstorms which persisted across the region for the next several days.

== Preparations ==
Satellite loop of Odile making landfall on September 15

Shortly after designation, a "yellow" alert was issued for western Michoacán, while a "green" alert was issued for the rest of the state, Colima, and Jalisco. Meanwhile, a "blue" alert was in effect for Nayarit, Oaxaca, and Guerrero. On September 11, the Servicio Meteorológico Nacional issued a tropical storm watch from Lazaro Cardenas to Manzanillo. The watch was gradually extended northward as Odile paralleled the coast, and was briefly upgraded into a tropical storm warning on September 14.

At 09:00 UTC September 13, a tropical storm watch was declared from La Paz, Baja California Sur to Santa Fe. At this time, all dynamical models kept this system far offshore, so Odile was only expected to pose a slight threat to the area. However, at 21:00 UTC, as the guidance rapidly shifted left, a tropical storm warning and hurricane watch was declared for the southern portion of the peninsula. At 03:00 UTC September 14, a little under 26 hours prior to its first landfall, a hurricane warning was declared. Meanwhile, the Baja California Peninsula was placed under "red" (maximum) alert. The aforementioned warnings and watches were gradually extended north as the storm progressed inland, before finally being cancelled after moving inland mainland Mexico on September 17.

Following the sudden shift in the projected track, a state of emergency was declared on September 14 in La Paz, Los Cabos, Comondú, Loreto and Mulegé. In Cabo San Lucas, 2,100 marine workers were set up to start evacuations. In La Paz, classes were suspended. Throughout the peninsula, 164 shelters were opened capable of harboring 30,000 people, but only 3,500 persons used these shelters. At the time of landfall, hotels in the state were at 46% of capacity, equal to 30,000 tourists, 26,000 of whom were foreigners. The ports of La Paz, Los Cabos, San José del Cabo, and Loreto were closed. Around 800 marine officers were placed on standby. Police with megaphones walked through vulnerable areas in Cabo San Lucas urging people to evacuate.

Much of southern Sonora was placed under a "yellow" alert, while a "green" alert was in effect for the central part of the state. On September 15, the "yellow" alert was upgraded to a "red" alert while classes were canceled in 34 municipalities. After Odile tracked into the Gulf of California, a "red" alert was declared for Hermosillo. A total of 214 people were evacuated to shelters in Sinaloa. A tropical storm warning was issued from Huatabampito to Puerto Libertad at 09:00 UTC on September 16, before being dropped 21 hours later.

== Impact ==
Costliest Pacific hurricanes
Rank	Cyclone	Season	Damage	Ref
1	5 Otis	2023	$12–16 billion	
2	1 Manuel	2013	$4.2 billion	
3	4 Iniki	1992	$3.1 billion	
4	3 John	2024	$2.45 billion	
5	4 Odile	2014	$1.82 billion	
6	TS Agatha	2010	$1.1 billion	
7	4 Hilary	2023	$948 million	
8	5 Willa	2018	$825 million	
9	1 Madeline	1998	$750 million	
10	2 Rosa	1994	$700 million	

=== Western Mexico ===
Heavy rains brought flooding to Oaxaca that killed two people; a nine-year old was swept away in a river and a company worker was struck by lightning. Due to a combination of high waves and storm surge, 69 buildings in Acapulco sustained damage, including 18 restaurants and a portion of a scenic walkway. Along the beaches of Nayarit and Colima, minor damage was reported. On the beach in Puerto Vallarta, two people were killed due to high waves.

=== Baja California Peninsula ===
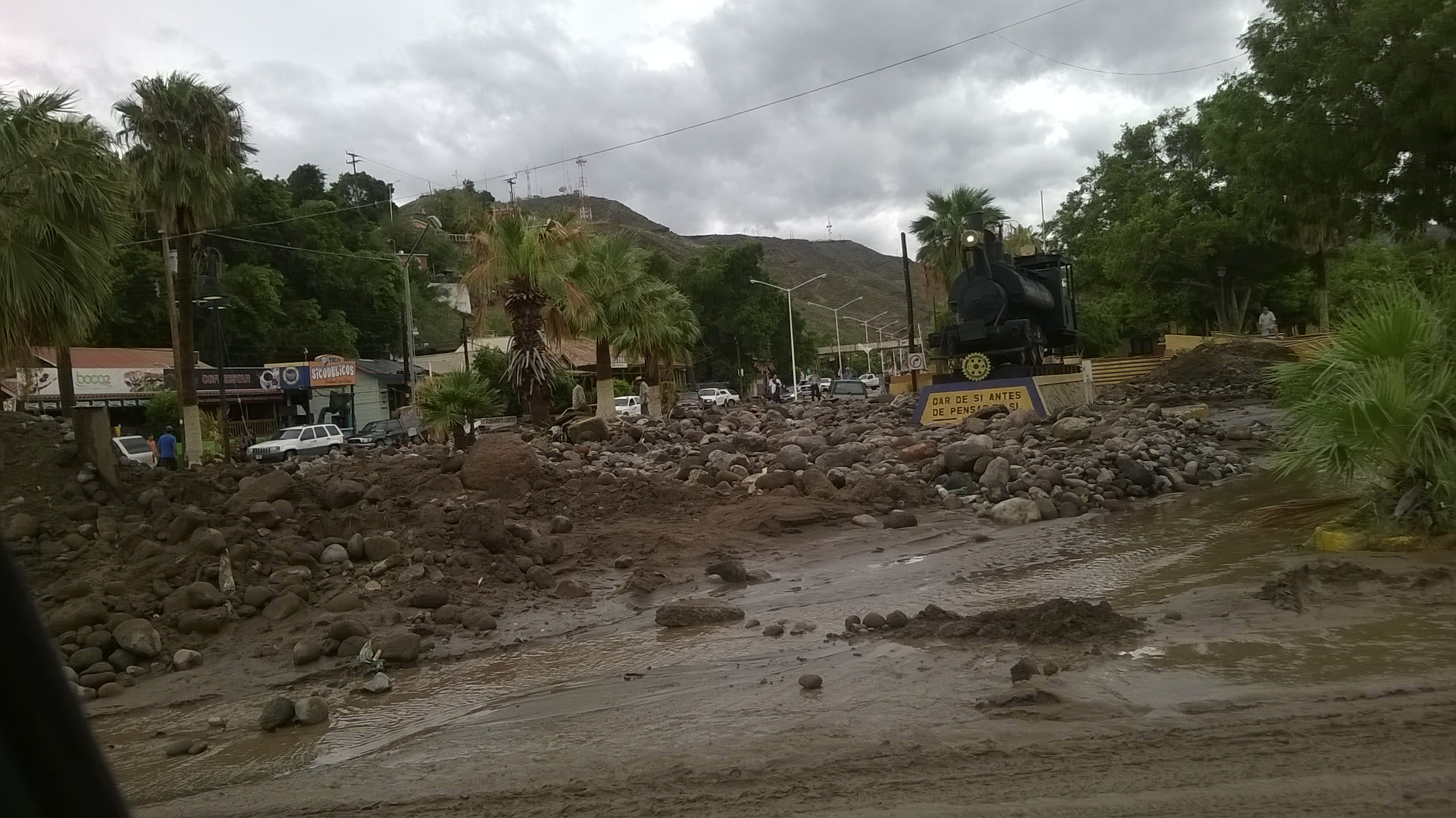
Damage in Santa Rosalía after Odile

After making landfall as a major hurricane, Odile deluged much of the Baja California peninsula with at least 4 to 6 in (100 to 150 mm) of rain. A maximum rainfall total of 8.67 in (220 mm) occurred in Santiago in Baja California Sur. Due to the major hurricane's large size, hurricane-force winds occurred over much of the state of Baja California Sur, while tropical storm force winds covered virtually all of the peninsula. The weather station at Cabo San Lucas recorded maximum winds of 90 mph (140 km/h) and gusts of 117 mph (188 km/h), along with a minimum pressure of 958.9 mbar (pHa, 28.32 inHg). Elsewhere, Bahía de Loreto reported wind gusts of 125 mph (201 km/h), which was the highest reported wind gust during the passage of Odile. A storm chaser located a little east of Cabo San Lucas reported a minimum pressure of 943.1 mbar (pHa, 27.78 inHg); this was the lowest pressure recorded during the passage of the hurricane. Due to the rains and wind, Odile brought widespread damage to the Baja California Peninsula.

All flights in and out of the Cabo San Lucas, La Paz, Los Cabos, and Loreto airports were cancelled on September 15. A terminal roof at the Los Cabos was detached and the ceiling was partially destroyed. As a result, approximately 3,000-4,000 people aboard 44 flights were stranded. Although the interior walls of the airport in La Paz sustained damage, the airport resumed normal operations within a week following Odile. Throughout the peninsula, 30,000 vacationers were stranded, including 26,000 from other nations, mainly from the United States, Canada, and the United Kingdom. Many of the stranded were evacuated to shelters, though one of the shelters collapsed due to overcrowding. By September 16, many tourists were airlifted to surrounding airports, including Tijuana, Mazatlán, Guadalajara, and Mexico City, although one person perished on a flight back via a heart attack due to stress the storm created.

The city of San José del Cabo sustained severe damage from the hurricane, where communication service was lost and one bridge was severely damaged. There, numerous hotels temporarily closed, including one that was forced to close for the remainder of the year. The Wild Canyon, an amusement park located between San Jose del Cabo and Cabo San Lucas, was 80% destroyed, including a 1,082 ft (330 m) long suspension bridge. In Cabo San Lucas, just east of where the storm made landfall, many trees and poles were downed. Offshore Cabo San Lucas, eight fishermen were rescued.

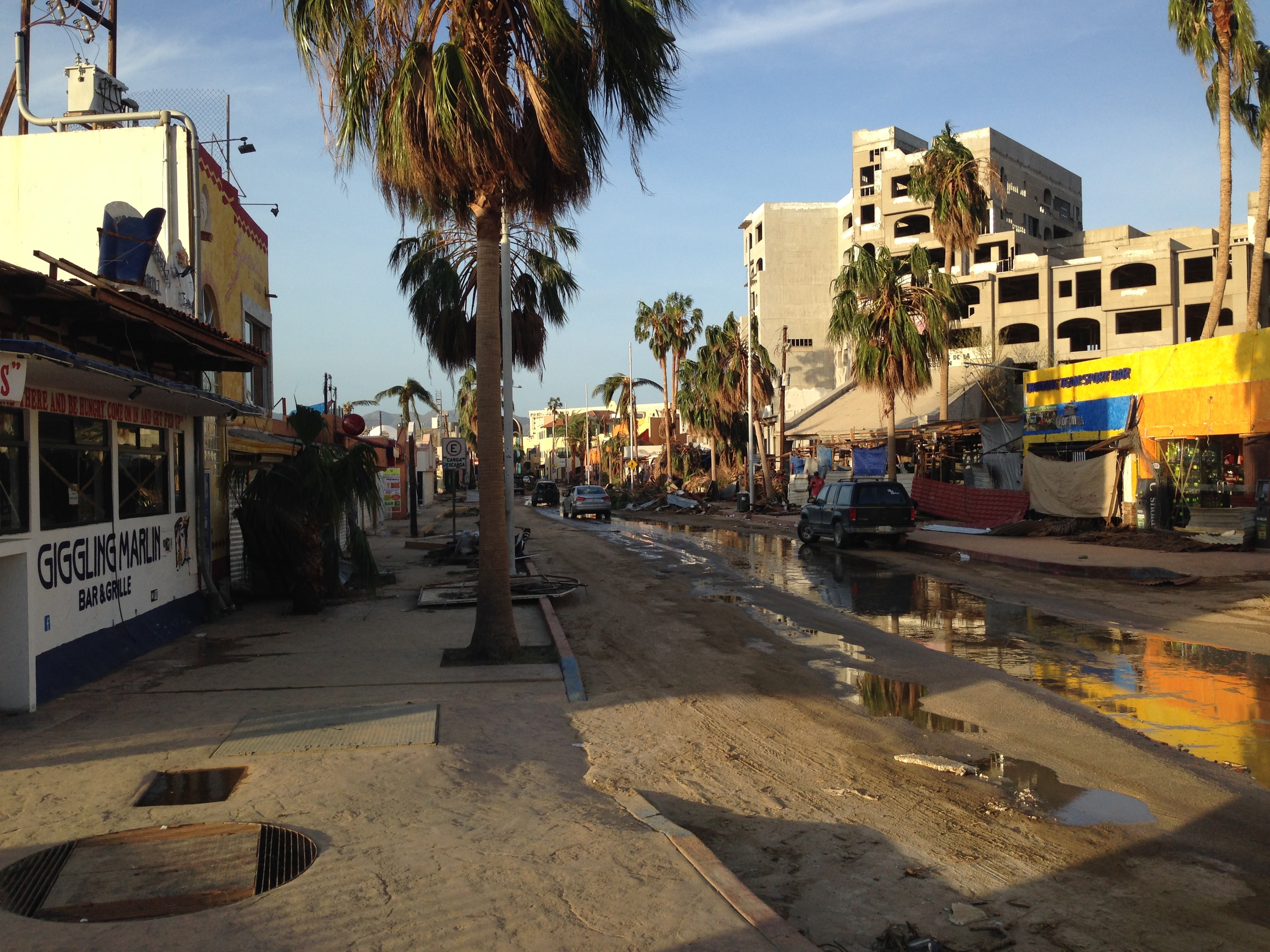
Bv. Paseo de La Marina in Cabo San Lucas the morning following Hurricane Odile

Along the La Paz harbor, 22 boats were damaged. The Instituto Sucaliforniano del Deporte, a sports stadium in La Paz, suffered extensive damage from the hurricane. In Vizcaino, 3,500 farm workers were evacuated. The town of San Ignacio was isolated due to road closures. Repairs to bridges near Todos Santos and Puerto Chale totaled Mex$500 million (US$37.6 million). On the eastern side of the peninsula, in the Bahía de los Ángeles area, 90 families were homeless due to floodwaters 1 m (3.3 ft) deep. That town was isolated when the hurricane destroyed the only road in.

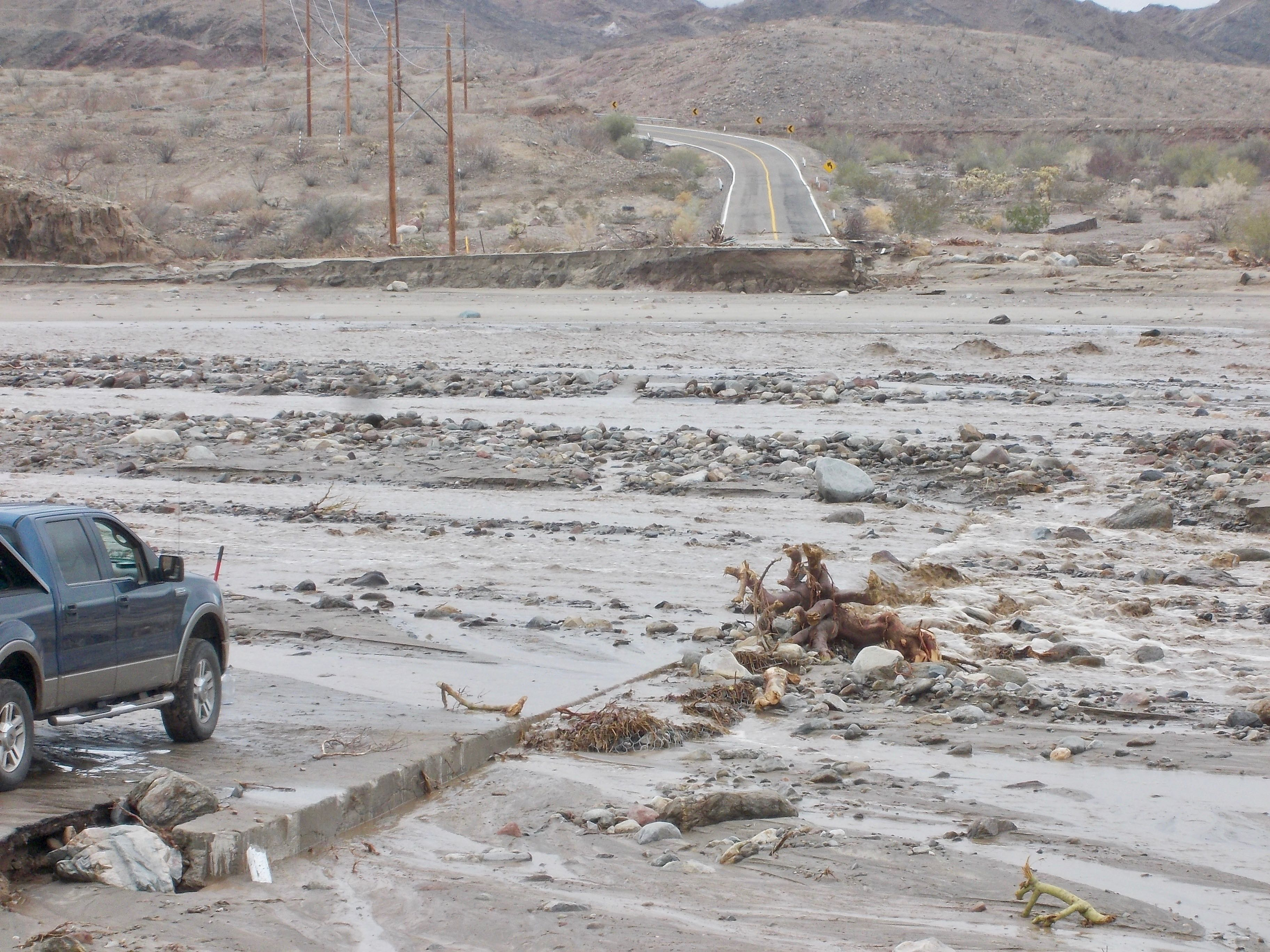
Damage to Federal Highway 12 leading out of Bahía de los Ángeles

Peninsula-wide, a total of 534 transmission towers and 700,963 telephone poles were downed; both these totals exceeded the totals of Hurricane Manuel and Hurricane Wilma. Consequently, at least 239,000 people were left without electricity throughout Baja California Sur alone, equal to around 92% of the state's population. All access to drinking water across Baja California Sur was cut off. About 30% of all crops on the peninsula were destroyed. Odile inflicted damage on 10,000 homes, including 1,800 of which were destroyed. The majority of hotels along the southern portion of the state sustained minor damage. At least 479 schools in the southern portion of the peninsula were damaged.

Five people were killed due to the hurricane on the peninsula, including a 62-year-old man who died in Santa Rosalia, who perished when trying to cross a river, a man who died of a heart attack in La Paz, and a South Korean mining executive whose car was swept away due to flooding. Overall, more than 11,000 people were evacuated from their homes due to flooding. At least 135 people were injured. Total damage in Baja California Sur amounted to Mex$24.1 billion (US$1.82 billion), and most of the damage came from the infrastructural and agricultural sectors.

=== Northwestern Mexico ===
After making its final landfall, the storm brought heavy rains to the northeastern part of the country. Odile brought rainfall totals of 4 to 8 in (100 to 200 mm) in Sonora and the eastern portion of Chihuahua in Mexico. The observed maximum rainfall total was about 9.17 in (233 mm) in Preca Cuauhtemoc, Sonora. Across Sonora, damage was minor and limited to fallen trees, roofs, and signs. Damage in Sonora was Mex$22.4 million (US$1.69 million). In Monterrey, four people perished. Three of the casualties occurred in a car that was attempting to cross a creek, where two children were also rendered missing.

=== United States ===
Even though Odile was still over the Gulf of California on September 16, low-level moisture ahead of Odile brought heavy rains to much of Southern California, including 0.8 in (20 mm) of rain within an hour at Montgomery Field Airport. The strongest thunderstorms occurred in the southern Inland Empire. Although rainfall totals were generally light, they were enough to cause isolated street flooding. The accompanying winds downed several power lines and numerous large trees in El Cajon, Mission Valley and Wildomar. Across central and eastern San Diego County, Odile generated several unusually powerful thunderstorms in the region. Gusty winds uprooted trees, felled branches, cut power lines, crushed several cars, and flipped at least one airplane at Montgomery Field Airport. The City of San Diego reported 30 buildings damaged, in addition to at least 12 storm-related power outages, resulting in more than 60,000 customers without power. Throughout Riverside County, damage totaled at $905,000.

In Arizona, Odile brought moderate rain to most of the state, peaking at 3.3 in (84 mm) in Douglas. Additionally, Picacho recorded a peak wind gust of 75 mph (121 km/h). Heavy rains led to minor street flooding to Navajo County. In Eloy, four warehouses were destroyed, and another two were damaged. In the southern portion of the state, the San Pedro River overtoppled Arizona State Route 92 along the Palominas and the Hereford Bridge, causing both bridges to be closed, while $30,000 in damage occurred when the river overflows its bank near Mammoth. In nearby Bisbee, minor flooding occurred, resulting in $500,000 in property damage. North of the state, in Utah, a 34-year-old hiker perished due to flooding in Zion National Park.

In New Mexico, a peak precipitation total of 4.13 in (105 mm) was recorded in Mogollon. Moisture from the storm brought significant drought relief to southern New Mexico; much of southeast New Mexico was drought-free by month's end. However, the rainfall, while beneficial, was not enough to eliminate more than three years of drought in other parts of New Mexico. Across northern New Mexico, Odile brought very little precipitation; rainfall totals there were below average for September 2014. One passenger drowned in Eddy County and an oil field worker died in flood waters just south of Carlsbad.

Nationwide, the highest storm total was 15.26 in (388 mm) in Gail, Texas. There, heavy rains resulted in road closings, power outages, and flash flood warnings. In El Paso, there were numerous reports of widespread flash flooding, though no injuries were reported. In Houston, heavy rains resulted in minor flooding. In all, two people were killed across the state. A sheriff died after she became trapped by flood waters near the shores of Lake Austin and a 64-year-old woman drowned in flash flooding in northeastern El Paso.

== Aftermath ==
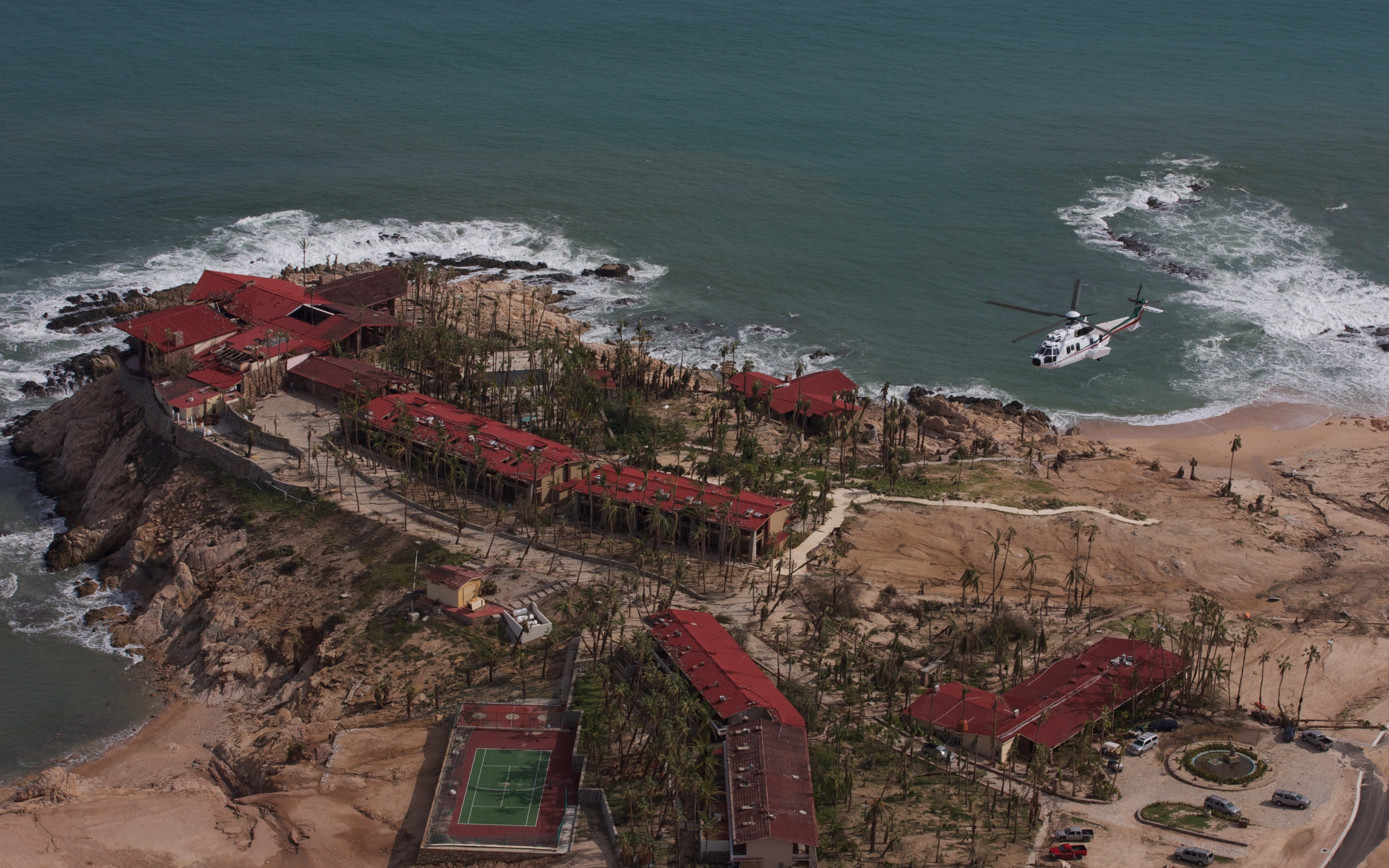
Along the coast of Los Cabos the morning following Hurricane Odile

Officials estimated that it would take 10 days for the Los Cabos airport to fully re-open. In the aftermath, three people were arrested due to looting, and martial law was declared, Hundreds of people robbed food, water, televisions, and other goods in supermarkets and even some dwellings in both Cabo San Lucas and San José del Cabo. In response, the government deployed 1,000 extra federal police to the Baja California Peninsula. A series of "police checkpoints" were set up to prevent looters from migrating to La Paz, the capital and largest city of the state. Furthermore, 15 neighborhoods organized their own security systems and many residents purchased guns for protection.

Within nine days after Odile, power was resorted to 95% of customers across the peninsula and by early October, power was fully restored. Due to efforts of over 20,000 workers, all of the destroyed bridges were repaired within two months. Tax deductions were also given to all citizens in five municipalities. On September 26, Walmart re-opened all stores across San Jose Del Cabo. On October 3, the first cruise ship returned to the state. Seven days later, the San Jose Del Cabo airport resumed international flights. Within seven weeks after Odile, 70% of restaurants and 80% of recreational actives had resumed operations, and 3,000 hotel rooms were open. Towards the end of the year, most of the facilities in the Wild Canyon amusement park returned to normal. By early 2015, several San Jose del Cabo corridor area hotels were already re-built. By early February, 80% of 14,000 hotel rooms in the area were available for use. However, inland areas of the city did not recover as quickly. The resort town of Cabo San Lucas did not suffer as much damage as surrounding areas, and thus recovered quickly. Elsewhere, in Sonora, a state of emergency was declared in 21 municipalities.

Following the disaster, about 500 workers were deployed to provide 2,000 groceries to victims. The Mexican Red Cross collected 163 tonnes (163,000 kg) of aid to victims of Odile in part due to the efforts of 1,080 people. Around 2,000 food parcels were shipped to the multiplicity of Los Cabos in part of the efforts from 500 volunteers. Around 800 personal hygiene kits were donated by the Mexican Red Cross to help 7,200 victims. The government of Chiapas sent an additional 60 t (60,000 kg) of aid to Baja California Sur. The Mexican Association of Malta set up 170 temporary shelters to evacuate the victims.

== Retirement ==
As a result of the damage and destruction caused by the storm in Mexico, the name Odile was later retired by the World Meteorological Organization in April 2015, and will never be used again for an Eastern Pacific hurricane. It was replaced with Odalys for the 2020 season.

== See also ==
- List of Baja California Peninsula hurricanes
- List of Arizona hurricanes
- List of California hurricanes
- List of New Mexico hurricanes
- 1941 Cabo San Lucas hurricane
- Hurricane Liza (1976) – Considered the worst natural disaster in the history of Baja California Sur
- Hurricane Nora (1997) – Caused flooding in Baja California, California, and Arizona.
- Hurricane Marty (2003) – Caused flooding and coastal impacts in Baja California Sur
- Hurricane John (2006) – Produced moderate damage on the Baja California Peninsula
- Tropical Storm Lidia (2017) – Took a similar track to Odile in Baja California Sur.
- Hurricane Newton (2016) – Caused flooding and impacts in Baja California Sur
- Hurricane Lorena (2019) - Caused minor to moderate damage in the Baja California Sur
