= Tropical Storm Lidia (2017) =

Pacific tropical storm

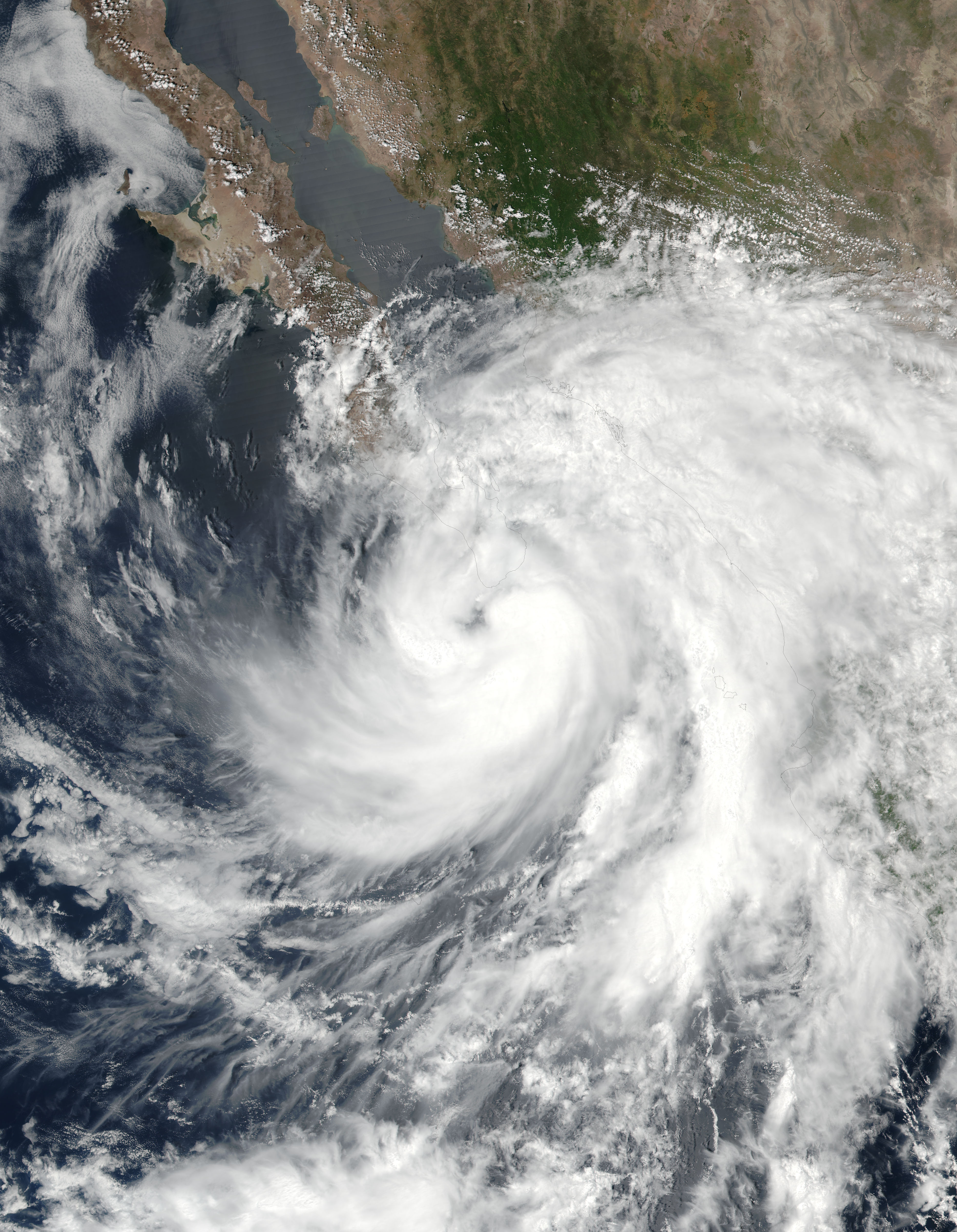
- Tropical Storm Lidia at peak intensity late on August 31

Meteorological history
- Formed: August 31, 2017
- Remnant low: September 3, 2017
- Dissipated: September 4, 2017

Tropical storm
- 1-minute sustained (SSHWS/NWS)
- Highest winds: 65 mph (100 km/h)
- Lowest pressure: 986 mbar (hPa); 29.12 inHg

Overall effects
- Fatalities: 20 total
- Damage: $123 million (2017 USD)
- Areas affected: Pacific Coast of Mexico, Baja California Peninsula, Arizona, California
- IBTrACS /
- Part of the 2017 Pacific hurricane season

Tropical Storm Lidia was a large tropical cyclone that caused flooding in Baja California Peninsula and parts of western Mexico. The fourteenth tropical cyclone and twelfth named storm of the 2017 Pacific hurricane season, Lidia developed from a large area of disturbed weather west of the Pacific Coast of Mexico on August 31. The storm intensified while moving generally northward or northwestward, peaking with maximum sustained winds of 65 mph (105 km/h) later that day. On September 1, Lidia made landfall in Mexico near Puerto Chale, Baja California Sur, at peak intensity. The storm weakened while traversing the peninsula, ultimately emerging over the Pacific Ocean on September 3, where the storm degenerated into a remnant low. The system brought thunderstorms and wind gusts to Southern California, before dissipating on September 4.

In anticipation of the storm, several tropical cyclone warnings and watches were issued in the Baja California Peninsula and other areas along the Gulf of California. Flooding in Mexico City resulted in water entering hundreds of homes, while sinkholes formed on some roads. Overall, there were twenty fatalities, including two from electrocution and two from drowning.

== Meteorological history ==
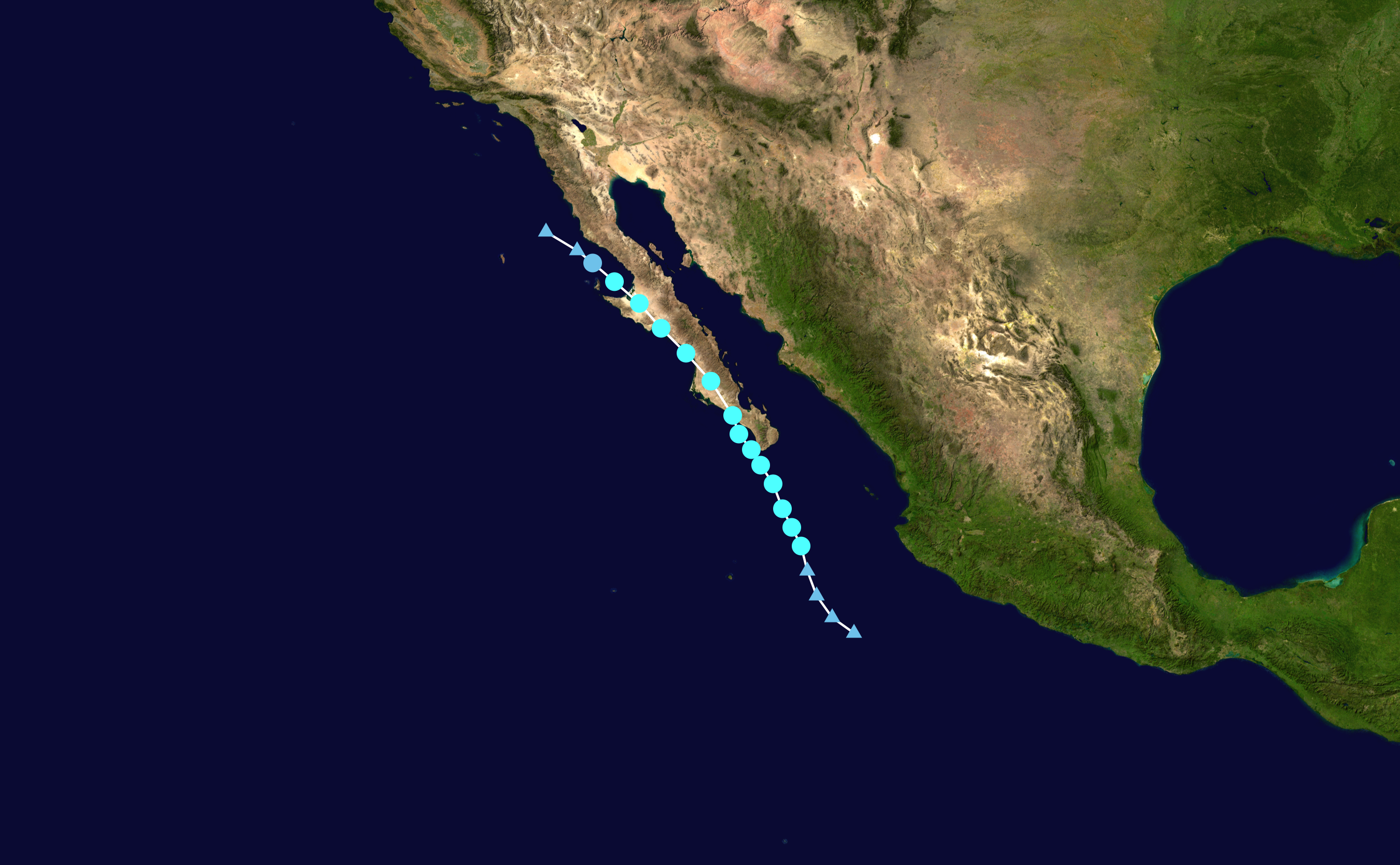
Map plotting the storm's track and intensity, according to the Saffir–Simpson scale Map key Saffir–Simpson scale Tropical depression (≤38 mph, ≤62 km/h) Tropical storm (39–73 mph, 63–118 km/h) Category 1 (74–95 mph, 119–153 km/h) Category 2 (96–110 mph, 154–177 km/h) Category 3 (111–129 mph, 178–208 km/h) Category 4 (130–156 mph, 209–251 km/h) Category 5 (≥157 mph, ≥252 km/h) Unknown Storm type Tropical cyclone Subtropical cyclone Extratropical cyclone, remnant low, tropical disturbance, or monsoon depression

A low-pressure area offshore the west coast of Mexico developed in late August 2017. Early on August 26, the National Hurricane Center (NHC) first discussed the probability of tropical cyclogenesis in a tropical weather outlook (TWO). Initially, the NHC assessed a 0% chance of development within two days and 30% chance within five days, citing marginally favorable conditions. An elongated trough of low pressure formed by late on August 27 and was initially composed of disorganized showers and thunderstorms. After environmental conditions became more favorable and the storm organized significantly – but still lacked a well-defined center – the NHC began classifying the low-pressure area as Potential Tropical Cyclone Fourteen-E at 21:00 UTC on August 29. The low soon developed banding features and intensified throughout the day on August 30. After data from an unmanned NASA Global Hawk and observation stations indicated that the broad circulation became more consolidated, the NHC initiated advisories on Tropical Storm Lidia at 18:00 UTC on August 30 about 315 mi (507 km) south-southeast of the southern tip of the Baja California Peninsula.

The storm, which was relatively large, moved north-northwestward due to flow from a weak ridge over Mexico and a weak cyclonic gyre to the west. Favorable conditions such as warm sea surface temperatures and low wind shear allowed Lidia to intensify, and by 00:00 UTC on September 1, the storm peaked with maximum sustained winds of 65 mph (105 km/h) and a minimum atmospheric pressure of 986 mbar (986 hPa; 29.1 inHg), which was based on Dvorak estimates with the hints of an eye feature. Around 12:00 UTC on the following day, Lidia made landfall near Punta Marquez, Baja California Sur, with winds of 60 mph (97 km/h). Shortly after landfall, satellite imagery indicated that convection associated with Lidia was becoming disorganized. The cyclone weakened significantly while traversing the mountainous terrain of the Baja California Peninsula, and by early on September 2, deep convection was mainly limited to a few strong clusters near the center. Around that time, Lidia briefly moved offshore, before making another landfall near Punta Abreojos a few hours later, with winds of 45 mph (72 km/h). By that time, Lidia weakened steadily, and emerged over the Pacific Ocean on September 2. However, Lidia continued to weaken due to cold sea surface temperatures. After failing to produce deep convection for about 12–15 hours, the NHC declared that Lidia had degenerated into a remnant low-pressure area at 09:00 UTC on September 3, about 40 mi (64 km) southwest of Punta Baja, Baja California. On September 3, Lidia's remnants brought thunderstorms, wind gusts, and flash flooding to Southern California, before being absorbed by another upper-level low off the coast of California, on September 4.

== Preparations and impact ==
Infrared satellite loop of Lidia making landfall in the Baja California Peninsula on September 1

Upon the NHC initiating advisories on Potential Tropical Cyclone Fourteen-E at 21:00 UTC on August 29, the Government of Mexico issued a tropical storm warning and a hurricane watch from Todos Santos and Los Barriles in Baja California Sur. At 03:00 UTC on the following day, a tropical storm watch was posted from Los Barriles to San Evaristo. The hurricane watch extended northward to east of La Paz at 15:00 UTC on August 30, while a tropical storm warning was issued from west of La Paz to Loreto and from north of Los Barriles to La Paz. Additionally, a tropical storm watch became in effect from Bahia Tempehuaya to Huatabampito in Sinaloa. Three tropical storm warnings were issued at 21:00 UTC on August 30 from Bahia Tempehuaya to Huatabampito, from La Paz to San Evaristo, and from Santa Fe to Puerto Cortes in Baja California Sur, while a tropical storm watch was posted from Puerto Cortes to Puerto San Andresito.

At 09:00 UTC on August 31, tropical storm warnings were extended from north of Puerto Cortes to Puerto San Andresito, north of San Evaristo to Loreto, and north of Huatabampito to Guaymas, Sonora. Simultaneously, a tropical storm watch was issued from north of Puerto San Andresito to Punta Abreojos, north of Loreto to Bahia San Juan Bautista in the state of Baja California, and north of Guaymas to Bahía Kino in Sonora.

In Mexico City, heavy rainfall disrupted the public transportation network at several locations. A number of roads were flooded, including parts of the Circuito Interior and Avenida Oceanía. A large sinkhole engulfed an entire central street and measured at least 33 ft (10 m) in width and 23 ft (7.0 m) in depth. Hundreds of homes in the city were flooded. Bad weather conditions at Mexico City International Airport resulted in the cancellation 18 flights and the diversion of about 150 other flights. In Cuautitlán Izcalli, about 300 people were evacuated after the El Ángulo dam collapsed, with water entering hundreds of dwellings, while many other homes were flooded with sewage in Ecatepec de Morelos after a canal overflowed. Flooding triggered red alerts on the color coded alert system in the municipalities of Azcapotzalco, Cuajimalpa, Gustavo A. Madero, Miguel Hidalgo, and Venustiano Carranza, while an orange alert was issued for Cuauhtémoc.

Heavy precipitation was also reported in northwestern Mexico, with nearly 12 in (300 mm) of rain observed in San José del Cabo. Nationwide, twenty deaths were attributed to the storm, including two from electrocution and two from drowning. Wind advisories were issued for parts of Southern California as the remnants of Lidia continued to move northward. A microburst event in Santa Barbara associated with the remnants of Lidia seriously injured a teenager as she was struck by a canoe at the beach. Damages in Baja California Sur were calculated at MX$2.2 billion (US$123 million), including MX$187 million (US$10.5 million) in infrastructural sector.

== See also ==
- Weather of 2017
- Tropical cyclones in 2017
- List of Eastern Pacific tropical storms
- Other tropical cyclones named Lidia
- List of Baja California Peninsula hurricanes
- Tropical Storm Julio (2008) – Minimal storm that made landfall in a similar location.
- Hurricane Odile (2014) – Took a similar track to Lidia's in Cabo San Lucas, as a Category 3 hurricane.
- Hurricane Newton (2016) – Affected the Baja California Peninsula roughly a year before Lidia.
