= Hurricane Norma (2023) =

Category 4 Pacific hurricane in 2023

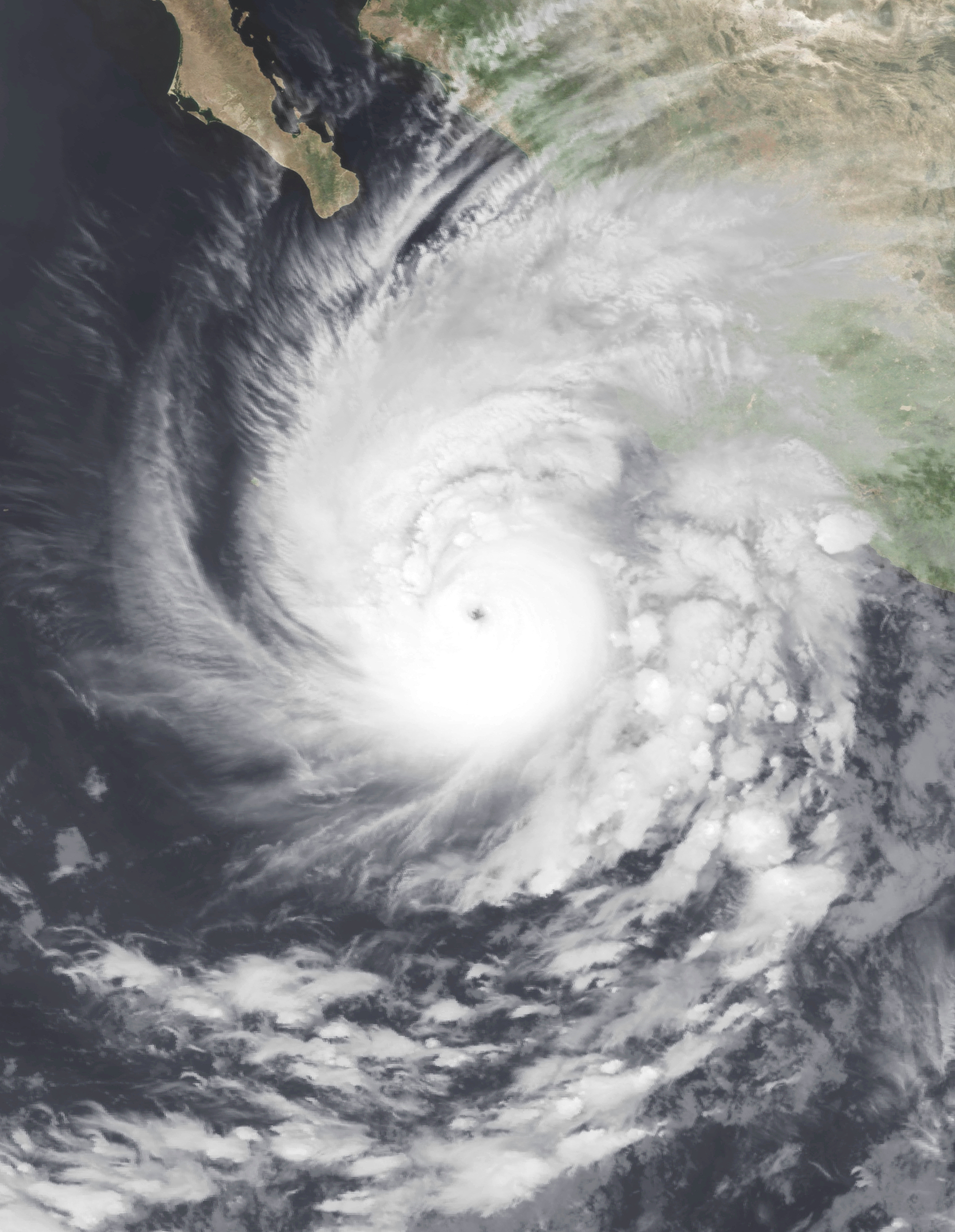
- Norma at its peak intensity while south of the Baja California peninsula on October 19

Meteorological history
- Formed: October 17, 2023
- Dissipated: October 23, 2023

Category 4 major hurricane
- 1-minute sustained (SSHWS/NWS)
- Highest winds: 130 mph (215 km/h)
- Lowest pressure: 939 mbar (hPa); 27.73 inHg

Overall effects
- Fatalities: 3 total
- Damage: $28.4 million (2023 USD)
- Areas affected: Mexico (Baja California Sur and Sinaloa)
- Part of the 2023 Pacific hurricane season

Hurricane Norma was one of four tropical cyclones to strike the Pacific Coast of Mexico in October 2023. The seventeenth tropical depression, fourteenth named storm, ninth hurricane and seventh major hurricane (Note: Hurricanes reaching Category 3 and higher—1-minute sustained winds higher than 110 miles per hour (178 km/h)—on the Saffir–Simpson scale are described as major hurricanes.) of the 2023 Pacific hurricane season, Norma developed from an area of low pressure that formed off the coast of southern Mexico on October 15, 2023. The disturbance gradually organized as it progressed westward parallel to the coast, and developed into Tropical Storm Norma on October 17. Turning northward, Norma rapidly intensified to a Category 4 hurricane as it continued to parallel the west coast of Mexico. Less favorable environmental conditions caused Norma to gradually weaken as it approached the Baja California peninsula. The cyclone made landfall on the Mexican state of Baja California Sur as a Category 1 hurricane. Norma continued to weaken as it crossed the state. The storm emerged over the Gulf of California on October 22, and made landfall as a tropical depression the following day on the state of Sinaloa. Norma quickly dissipated as it moved inland over Mexico.

Norma resulted in extensive flooding across northwestern Mexico, peaking at nearly 480 mm (19 in) in parts of Baja California Sur. Numerous trees, homes and boats were damaged in the cities of Cabo San Lucas and La Paz. Damage across the state amounted to 285 million pesos (US$16 million). (Note: All currencies are in their 2023 values and are converted to United States dollars using data from the International Monetary Fund published by the World Bank.) Norma resulted in three fatalities in Sinaloa, as well as severe damage to numerous houses and businesses. Infrastructural damage alone in Sinaloa reached 220 million pesos (US$12.4 million).

== Meteorological history ==
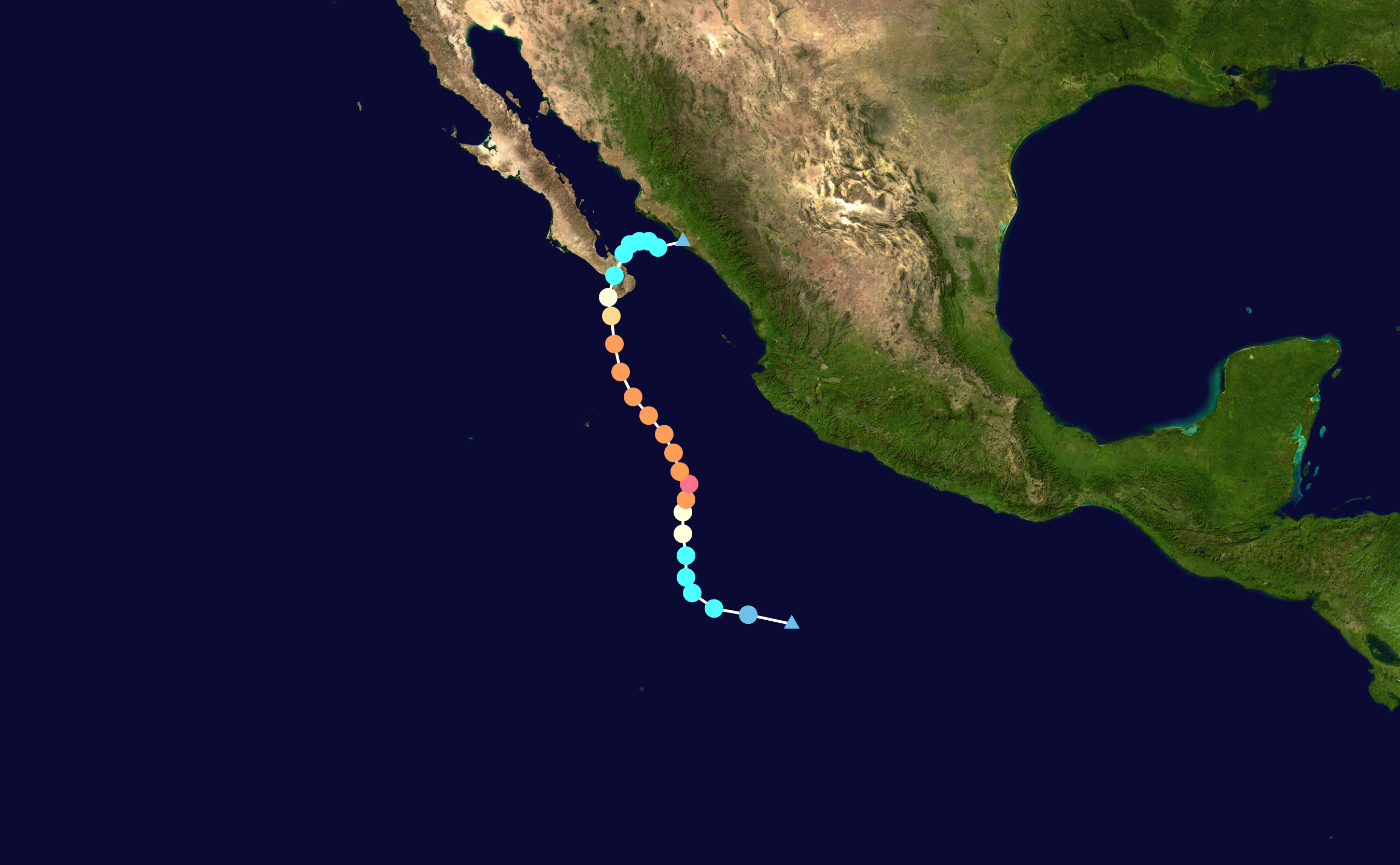
Map plotting the storm's track and intensity, according to the Saffir–Simpson scale Map key Saffir–Simpson scale Tropical depression (≤38 mph, ≤62 km/h) Tropical storm (39–73 mph, 63–118 km/h) Category 1 (74–95 mph, 119–153 km/h) Category 2 (96–110 mph, 154–177 km/h) Category 3 (111–129 mph, 178–208 km/h) Category 4 (130–156 mph, 209–251 km/h) Category 5 (≥157 mph, ≥252 km/h) Unknown Storm type Tropical cyclone Subtropical cyclone Extratropical cyclone, remnant low, tropical disturbance, or monsoon depression

A broad low-pressure area developed over the northeastern Pacific Ocean on October 15, 2023, producing a large area of disorganized showers and thunderstorms. With this convective activity gradually consolidating, the system organized into a tropical depression by 12:00 UTC on October 17 (Note: All dates and times are in Coordinated Universal Time (UTC) unless otherwise noted.) about 400 nautical miles southwest of Manzanillo, Mexico. Six hours later, the depression strengthened into Tropical Storm Norma. Situated within an environment of warm sea-surface temperatures (SSTs), low vertical wind shear, and plentiful moisture, Norma underwent an almost two-day long period of rapid intensification shortly after forming, as a ridge over Mexico steered the system to the north while gradually slowing it down. At 18:00 UTC on October 18, 24 hours after being named, Norma strengthened into a hurricane. Just twelve hours later the storm achieved major hurricane status. Norma featured a well-defined, clear eye at this time.

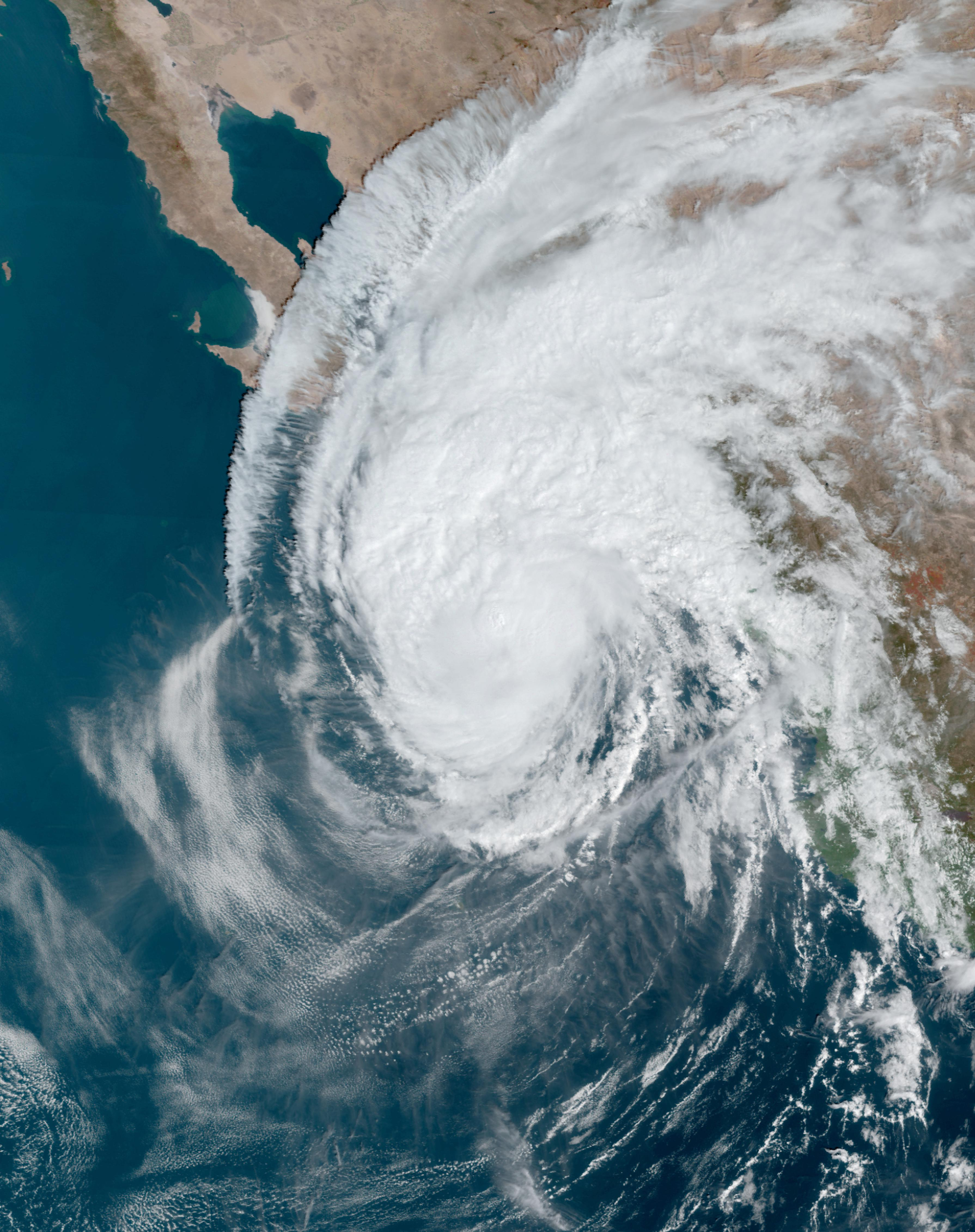
Hurricane Norma shortly before landfall on October 21

The major hurricane continued to move slowly north, parallel to the west coast of Mexico, as it rounded the ridge. Norma reached its peak intensity as a Category 4 hurricane at 12:00 UTC on October 19, with maximum sustained winds of 210 km/h (130 mph) and a minimum barometric pressure of 939 mbar (27.7 inHg). The storm was centered 350 nautical miles south of Cabo San Lucas at the time. After peaking in intensity, increased dry air and wind shear caused Norma's structure to degrade, and the storm weakened slightly as it turned northwestward and began to move more quickly. Norma fluctuated in intensity, achieving a secondary peak as a 195 km/h (120 mph) Category 3 hurricane on October 20. Despite this, increasingly cooler SSTs caused the hurricane to weaken rapidly as it turned north between the ridge over Mexico and a trough to its northwest. Norma made landfall on the Mexican state of Baja California Sur near 20:15 UTC on October 21 as a Category 1 hurricane, with maximum winds of 130 km/h (80 mph). Norma weakened to a tropical storm as it crossed the Baja California Peninsula, and emerged over the Gulf of California early the following day. Strong upper-level winds produced by the trough caused Norma's convective activity to be sheared away, and the storm weakened to a depression as it moved inland over the state of Sinaloa at 10:30 UTC on October 23. The cyclone dissipated over western Mexico by 18:00 UTC.

== Preparations and impact ==
Tropical storm and hurricane warnings were issued in advance of Norma’s landfalls, with the NHC anticipating rainfall totals of up to 460 mm (18 in) across portions of northwestern Mexico. Schools were closed across the states of Baja California Sur and Sinaloa. Los Cabos International Airport and La Paz International Airport were also shut down in advance of the storm. A total of 120 shelters were opened across Sinaloa. Members of the Mexican Navy were deployed by Mexican President Andres Manuel Lopez Obrador to assist residents impacted by Norma. The port of Puerto Vallarta was closed to small vessels as Norma passed offshore Jalisco.

=== Baja California Sur ===
Rainfall totals from Norma across northwestern Mexico

Torrential rainfall and strong winds affected Baja California Sur as Norma passed through the state. The intense rainfall led to extreme flooding, with peak accumulations of nearly 480 mm (19 in) in some areas. Several wind gusts of over 145 km/h (90 mph) were recorded across the state, peaking at 170 km/h (107 mph) at a weather station on the outskirts of Cabo San Lucas. Numerous streets and canals across La Paz flooded as Norma passed through Baja California Sur. Strong winds from Norma blew down numerous trees and palapas. Additionally, many sailboats and yachts were damaged in their piers along the city's coast. The port of La Paz was closed, leaving over 400 people stranded onboard a ferry crossing the Gulf of California from Sinaloa. Downed utility poles in Cabo San Lucas disrupted electrical service to over 10,000 people. In total, 109,209 electricity customers lost power during Norma's passage. In San José del Cabo, 1,700 people were placed in 24 storm shelters. Two people were rescued after flood waters swept away their truck. Damage on business sector in La Paz Municipality sum up to 20 million pesos (US$1.13 million). Total damage across Baja California Sur was calculated at 285 million pesos (US$16 million), according to the state government. Governor Castro stated that he was not anticipating financial assistance from the Mexican federal government to cover the cost of damage produced by Norma.

70,000 people were still left without power going into Monday, October 23. Schools remained closed in parts of the state into Monday as clean-up crews removed fallen trees and scattered debri across La Paz. Some municipalities in the state were left without power a week after the storm, contradicting reports from the Federal Electricity Commission (CFE) that power had been fully restored by October 24. Vandalism and looting also took place in various stores around Los Cabos. A disaster declaration was issued by the governor of Baja California Sur, Víctor Manuel Castro Cosío, due to the extensive damage Norma wrought to public infrastructure in southern regions of the state; despite this, most hotels in the area suffered minimal damage from the hurricane.

=== Sinaloa ===
Norma dumped heavy rainfall and caused widespread power outages across southern areas of Sinaloa as it made landfall on the state as a tropical depression. Peak accumulations of 300 mm (12 in) fell near where Norma's center came ashore. Three people died in the state: two in vehicle-related accidents and a child due to electrocution. Broken glass, fallen trees and damage to homes and business was reported, mainly in the municipalities of Los Mochis, Ahome and Guasave. The hurricane caused infrastructural damages totaled 220 million pesos (US$12.4 million) across Sinaloa, damaging several roads and four bridges, as well as causing eighteen sinkholes to form across thirteen municipalities. Almost 500 people were placed in storm shelters in the municipality of Guasave. Thirteen people were hospitalized due to a malfunctioning gasoline generator, though all were reported to be in stable condition. Norma spread heavy rainfall over the neighboring states of Chihuahua, Durango, Sonora and Nayarit as it moved inland.

== See also ==
- Weather of 2023
- Tropical cyclones in 2023
- Timeline of the 2023 Pacific hurricane season
- List of Category 4 Pacific hurricanes
- List of Baja California Peninsula hurricanes
- Other tropical cyclones named Norma
- Hurricane Newton (2016) – took a similar path and affected similar areas
- Hurricane Bud (2018) – another Category 4 hurricane that made landfall on the Baja California Peninsula
