= List of storms named Norma =

The name Norma has been used for ten tropical cyclones worldwide: eight in the East Pacific Ocean, one in the West Pacific Ocean and one in the Australian region. Norma has also been used for one European windstorm.

In the East Pacific:

- Tropical Storm Norma (1970) – its remnants fueled the Labor Day Storm of 1970, causing severe floods and damage in the U.S. state of Arizona
- Hurricane Norma (1974) – Category 1 hurricane that made landfall west of Acapulco, Mexico
- Hurricane Norma (1981) – Category 3 hurricane that caused minor damage in Mexico, though its remnants caused severe flooding in Texas and Oklahoma
- Hurricane Norma (1987) – Category 1 hurricane that dissipated just before landfall, caused heavy rainfall in California as a remnant low
- Tropical Storm Norma (1993) – moderate tropical storm that stayed at sea
- Tropical Storm Norma (2005) – strong tropical storm that also stayed in the open ocean
- Hurricane Norma (2017) – Category 1 hurricane that briefly threatened land but moved out to sea
- Hurricane Norma (2023) – Category 4 hurricane that caused minor damage in Baja California Sur and three deaths in Sinaloa

In the West Pacific:

- Typhoon Norma (1948) – formed in the open ocean without affecting land

In the Australian region:

- Cyclone Norma (1964) – formed in the open ocean without affecting land

In Europe:

- Storm Chandra (2026) – called Cyclone Norma by the Free University of Berlin
