= List of Baja California Peninsula hurricanes =

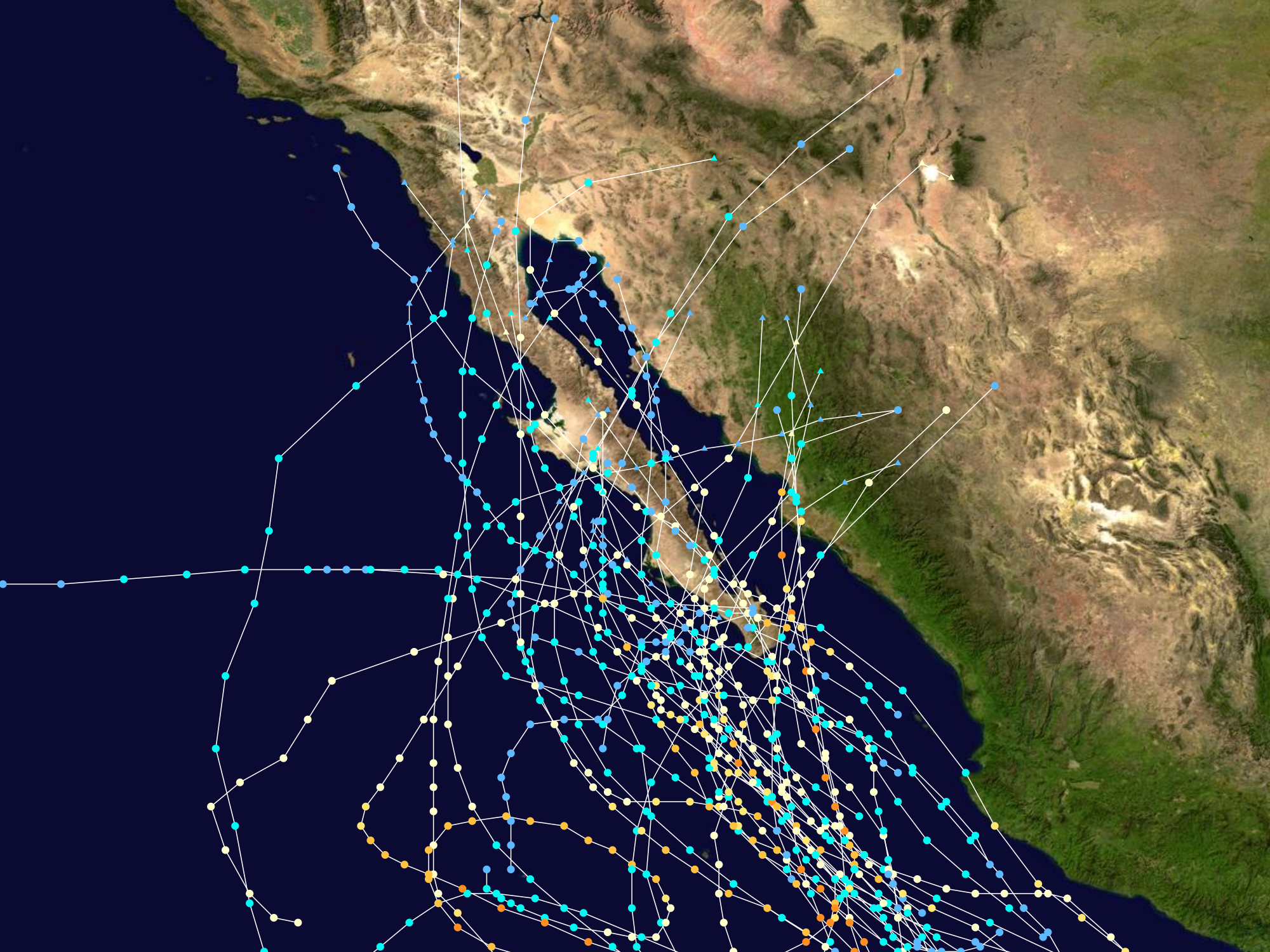
Paths of all hurricanes to hit the peninsula from 1949-2000

The list of Baja California Peninsula hurricanes includes all of the tropical cyclones that impacted the Baja California Peninsula, which includes the Mexican states of Baja California and Baja California Sur. In the period 1951 to 2000, Baja California had one hurricane and three tropical storms make landfall. During the same period, Baja California Sur witnessed nineteen hurricanes and thirty tropical storms. During the same time period, the region got hit by two major hurricanes (Hurricane Olivia in 1967 and Hurricane Kiko in 1989). The most expensive storm in the area is Hurricane Odile in 2014 and the deadliest is Hurricane Liza in 1976.

== List of tropical cyclones ==
=== Pre-1949 ===
- Sometime between June and October 1884: a tropical cyclone of unknown intensity made landfall in the peninsula.
- July 1902: A tropical cyclone made landfall in Baja California.
- August 1915: A tropical cyclone impacted the northern part of Baja California.
- September 13, 1918: Twenty-five deaths and heavy damage in La Paz and elsewhere resulted from tropical cyclone of unknown intensity making landfall on this date.
- August 1921: A tropical cyclone impacted the central part of the Baja California Peninsula.
- September 1921: A tropical cyclone's remnants tracked across the Baja California Peninsula.
- September 1921: The remnants of a tropical cyclone moved inland after dissipating on this date.
- August 1935: A tropical cyclone made landfall in southern Baja California and tracked northwards.
- September 1939: In the early part of this month, the first of three tropical cyclones to impact the peninsula this year hit the northern part of the area.
- September 1939: In the middle of the month, a tropical cyclone made landfall and promptly dissipated.
- September 1939: The third tropical cyclone to impact the peninsula this month hit part of Baja California Sur and dissipated onshore. Its remnants moved north.
- September 1941: A hurricane made landfall on the peninsula, causing extensive devastation and 15 deaths.
- September 1945: A tropical cyclone paralleled the Pacific coast of the peninsula just offshore before dissipating.
- September 1946: A tropical storm made landfall in the northern part of the Baja California Peninsula on an unknown date.
- September 11, 1949: A hurricane made landfall on the peninsula.

=== 1950s ===
- August 29, 1951: A tropical storm made landfall in the northern part of the peninsula.
- July 17, 1954: A hurricane made landfall on the peninsula.
- October 5, 1957: A hurricane made landfall on the peninsula.
- September 11, 1958: A tropical storm made landfall and passed north-northwest over the peninsula.
- October 4, 1958: A hurricane made landfall at the southern tip of the peninsula.
- September 9, 1959: A hurricane made landfall and traveled up the peninsula.

=== 1960s ===
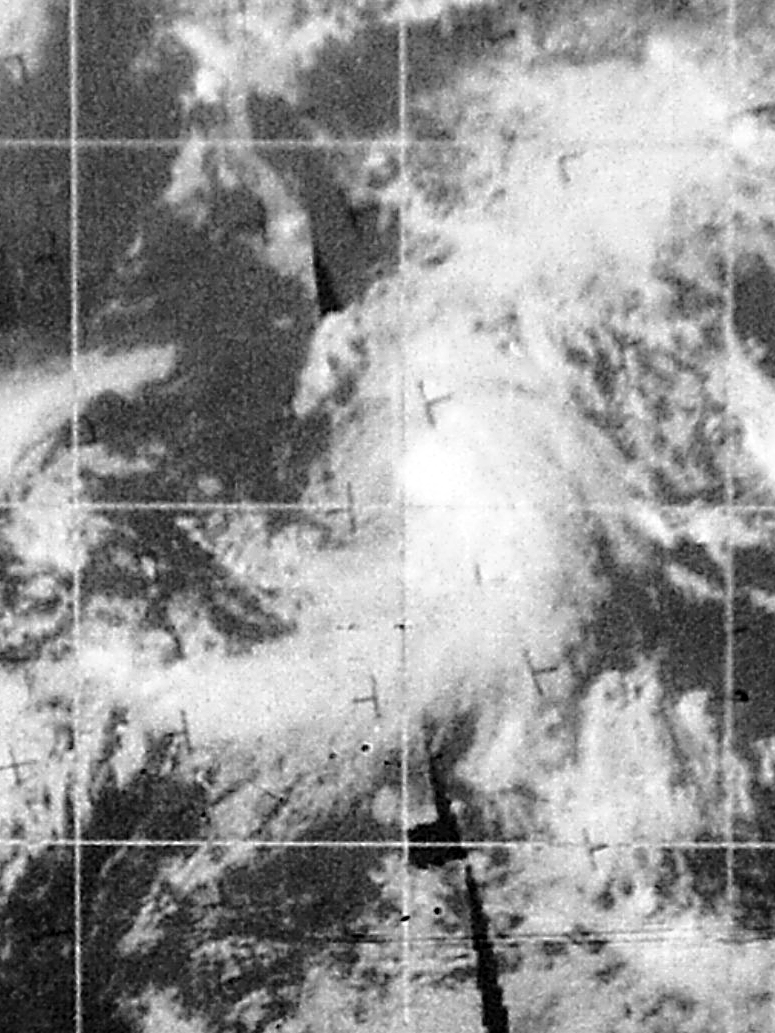
Hurricane Katrina, August 1967

- September 6, 1962: Tropical Storm Bernice made landfall on the peninsula.
- September 23–24, 1962: Tropical Storm Claudia skirted the Pacific coast of the northern part of the peninsula before making landfall.
- October 4, 1962: Hurricane Doreen passed close to the peninsula's southern tip before crossing the Gulf of California and making landfall.
- September 18, 1963: Tropical Depression Jen-Kath made landfall in northern Baja California, just south of the U.S.-Mexico border, after weakening from a tropical storm.
- September 6, 1965: Tropical Depression Emily made landfall in the northern part of the peninsula days after passing close by as a hurricane.
- September 15, 1966: Tropical Storm Helga made landfall on the peninsula well after weakening from a hurricane.
- September 28, 1966: Tropical Storm Kirsten made landfall on the peninsula.
- August 31, 1967: Hurricane Katrina made landfall on the southern tip of the peninsula and then traveled up through the peninsula. Katrina did heavy damage, sinking 60 ships and leaving 2500 homeless after it partially destroyed the city of San Felipe.
- October 14, 1967: Hurricane Olivia becomes the first of only one of three major hurricanes to make landfall on Baja California. No damage figures exist from Olivia due to the scarce population of the area it struck. However, a total of 61 lives were lost.
- October 2, 1968: Hurricane Pauline made landfall on the peninsula and crossed it. Four or five people died when a sailboat was sunk in Magdalena Bay.

=== 1970s ===
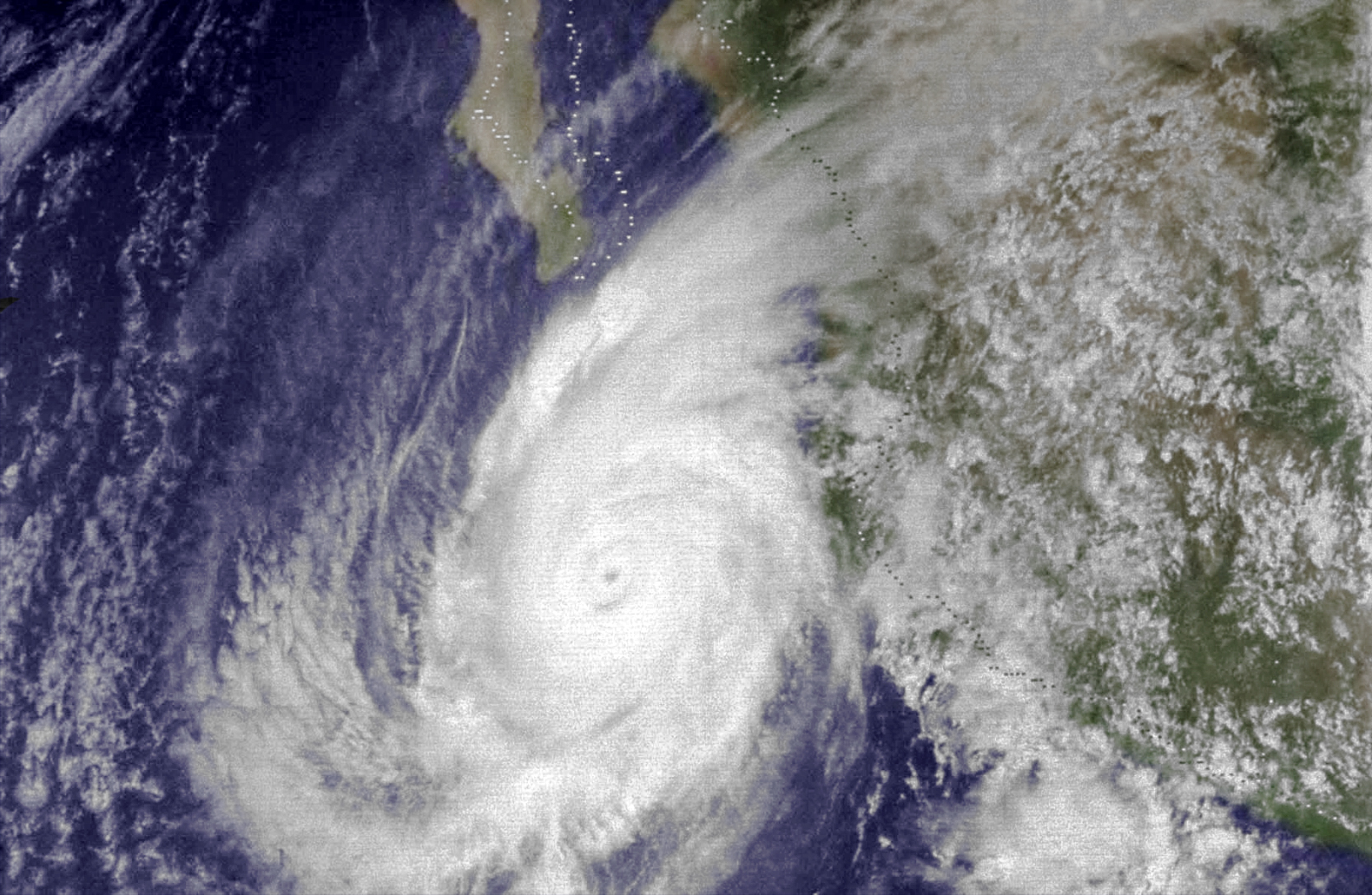
Hurricane Liza, September 1976

- September 5, 1970: Tropical Depression Norma dissipated just offshore, with its moisture being drawn into an extratropical system further to the north.
- September 30, 1971: Tropical Depression Olivia made landfall on the peninsula.
- October 6, 1972: Tropical Storm Joanne made landfall in the northern part of the peninsula, causing localized flooding.
- September 25, 1973: Hurricane Irah made landfall on the peninsula. Damage was limited to power lines and flooding.
- September 10, 1976: Tropical Storm Kathleen came close to the Point Eugenia peninsula before making landfall just south of Ensenada that same day as it accelerated northwards. No damage was reported.
- October 1, 1976: Hurricane Liza passed close to the southern tip of the Baja California Peninsula. Liza's heavy rains caused a flash flood that burst a dyke near La Paz. The resulting torrent of water did heavy damage and killed at least 435 and probably more than 630 people.
- August 15, 1977: Hurricane Doreen briefly made landfall as it skirted the Pacific coast of the peninsula.

=== 1980s ===
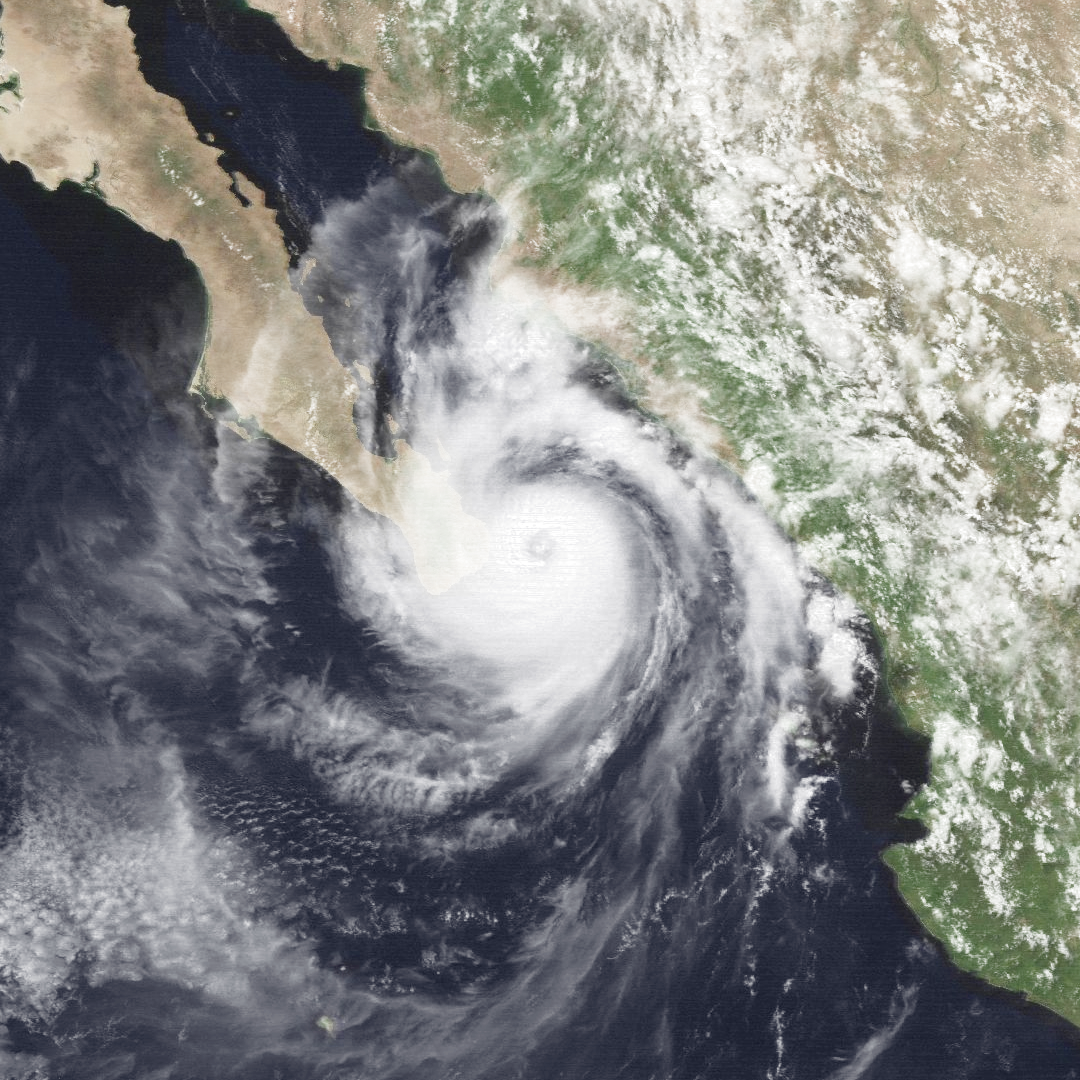
Hurricane Kiko, August 1989

- August 30, 1981: Tropical Depression Irwin made landfall on the peninsula.
- September 20, 1981: Tropical Storm Knut brushes the southeastern part of the peninsula.
- October 1981: Tropical Storm Lidia caused flash flooding and extremely heavy rains over the southeastern portion of the peninsula.
- September 29, 1982: Hurricane Paul briefly passed over the extreme southern tip of the peninsula. No damage or casualties were reported.
- Late September–Early October 1983: Moisture partially related to Tropical Storm Octave caused widespread rainfall. A total of 12 in (300 mm) was reported in Altar, along the extreme northern part of the peninsula. Lighter totals between 1–3 in (25–75 mm) were reported along the southern portion of the peninsula.
- Late June 1984: Hurricane Cristina brought high clouds to the area for a few days.
- July 1984: Hurricane Fausto brought additional cloudiness and showers to southern Baja California Sur for four days.
- September 26, 1984: Tropical Storm Norbert made landfall on the peninsula and rapidly weakens. No damage or casualties were reported.
- October 3, 1984: Weakening Tropical Depression Polo made landfall in the extreme southern part of the Baja California Peninsula.
- Late September 1985: Hurricane Terry was predicted to make landfall in central Baja California and threaten San Diego. However, Terry never made landfall.
- Early October 1985: Hurricane Waldo bypasses the Baja California Peninsula; however, moderate rain was recorded along the southern part of the Baja California Peninsula.
- September 22, 1986: Hurricane Newton made landfall in Cabo San Lucas. No deaths were reported.
- October 1, 1986: Hurricane Paine brushed Cabo San Lucas. Heavy precipitation fell in the southern portion of the Baja California Peninsula, and upwards of 7 inches (18 cm) fell across its path. Strong winds knocked down trees and caused disruptions to city services.
- Early October 1986: Hurricane Roslyn drops light rainfall in extreme southern Baja California Sur despite remaining far offshore.
- September 20, 1987: Hurricane Norma dissipated a mere 93 mi (150 km) south of the Baja California Peninsula. There were no reports of damage or flooding from the storm; the area Norma stuck was sparsely populated.
- October 1–2, 1987: Tropical Storm Pilar produced the heaviest rain in one location since 1971.
- August 27, 1989: Hurricane Kiko made landfall on the Gulf of California side of the peninsula. It caused heavy damage but no deaths. Winds gusting to over 109 mph (175 km/h) brought down numerous trees and power lines.
- October 5, 1989: Tropical Storm Raymond made landfall on the peninsula. Since Raymond was moving rapidly, only minor impacts were recorded in Mexico.

=== 1990s ===
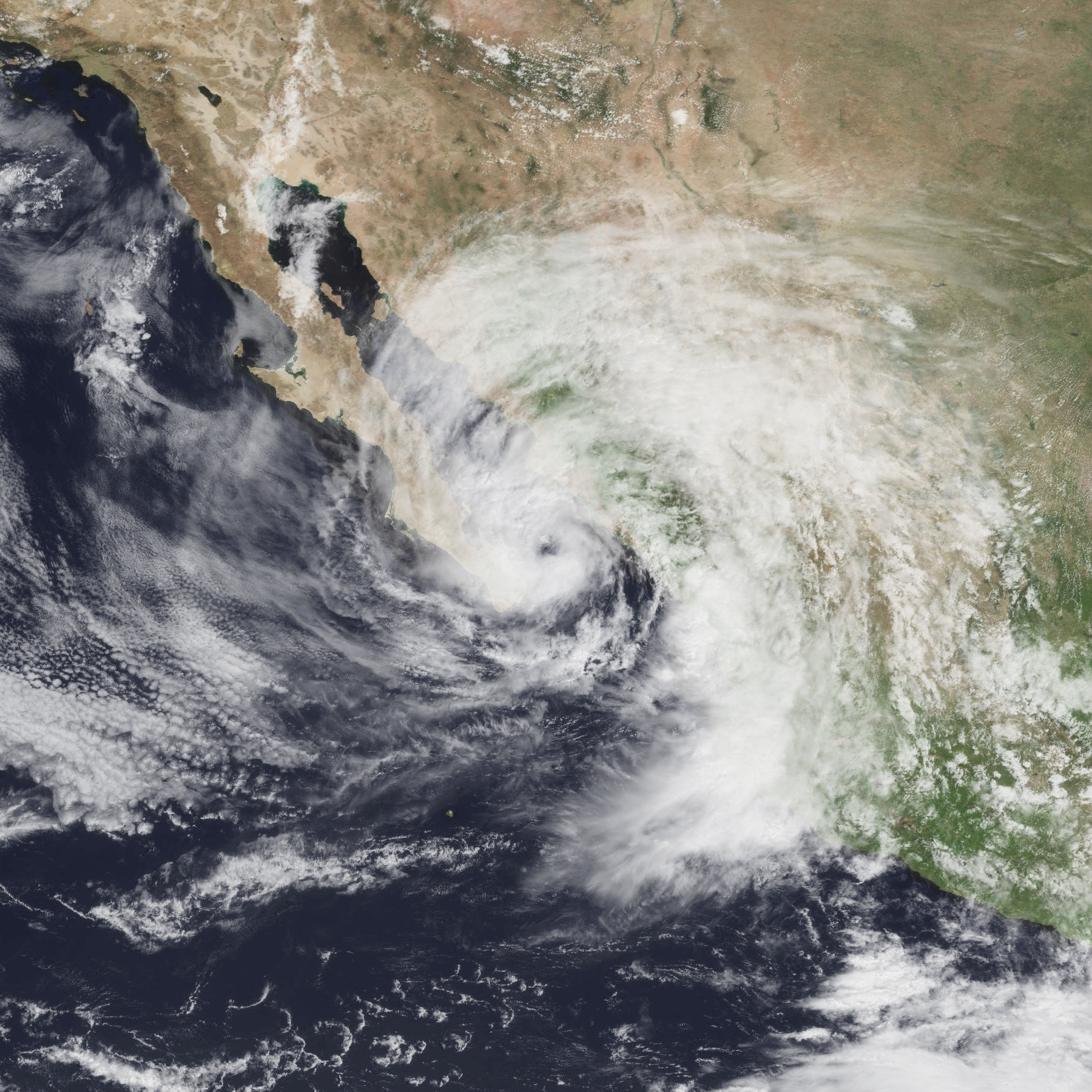
Tropical Storm Isis, September 1998

- Late June 1990: The remnants of Hurricane Boris brought heavy rains to the peninsula. No direct damages or casualties were reported from Boris.
- October 2, 1990: Tropical Storm Rachel made landfall on the southern tip of the Baja California Peninsula. No reports of either deaths or damage were received. However, the highest rainfall total from the system in the entire nation totaled 9.85 in (250 mm) at Santa Anita near the southern tip of Baja California Sur.
- August 23, 1992: Hurricane Lester made landfall near Punta Abrejeos as it rapidly crossed the peninsula. There were no reported deaths, but some damage was reported.
- July 8, 1993: Tropical Depression Calvin made landfall on the peninsula east-southeast of La Paz. No damage or deaths were reported on the peninsula.
- August 25–26, 1993: Tropical Storm Hilary made two landfalls on the peninsula. No deaths or damage were reported.
- August 11, 1995: Hurricane Flossie passed close to the peninsula. Two people drowned in Cabo San Lucas.
- September 4, 1995: Strong winds, rains, and storm surge from Hurricane Henriette left 800 homeless and caused heavy road damage to the southern part of Baja California Sur. No deaths were reported.
- September 14–15, 1995: Hurricane Ismael passed up the Gulf of California. A total of 57 fishermen were killed, some of whom may have been from or near the peninsula.
- September 13, 1996: Hurricane Fausto made landfall near Todos Santos on the peninsula. The only death was of a vacationer from San Diego. A downed power line electrocuted the vacationer in Cabo San Lucas. Damage elsewhere was appreciable, with downed power lines, smashed windows, and significant disruption throughout the peninsula.
- Early August 1997: Hurricane Guillermo produced high waves of up to 12 ft (3.7 m). These rough ocean conditions flooded homes situated along the coast. Two people were killed after being swept out to sea.
- September 25, 1997: Hurricane Nora made landfall near Punta Eugenia. Nora killed two people; one person was electrocuted in Mexicali and a diver was drowned near San Quintín.
- September 2, 1998: Tropical Storm Isis made landfall near San José del Cabo. Throughout the Gulf of California region, 18 people were killed and 769 houses were destroyed.
- October 20, 1998: Hurricane Madeline dissipated about 120 mi (190 km) to the southeast of La Paz; however, no deaths or damages were reported.
- September 7, 1999: Tropical Storm Greg made landfall near Cabo San Lucas. No damage or casualties were reported.

=== 2000s ===
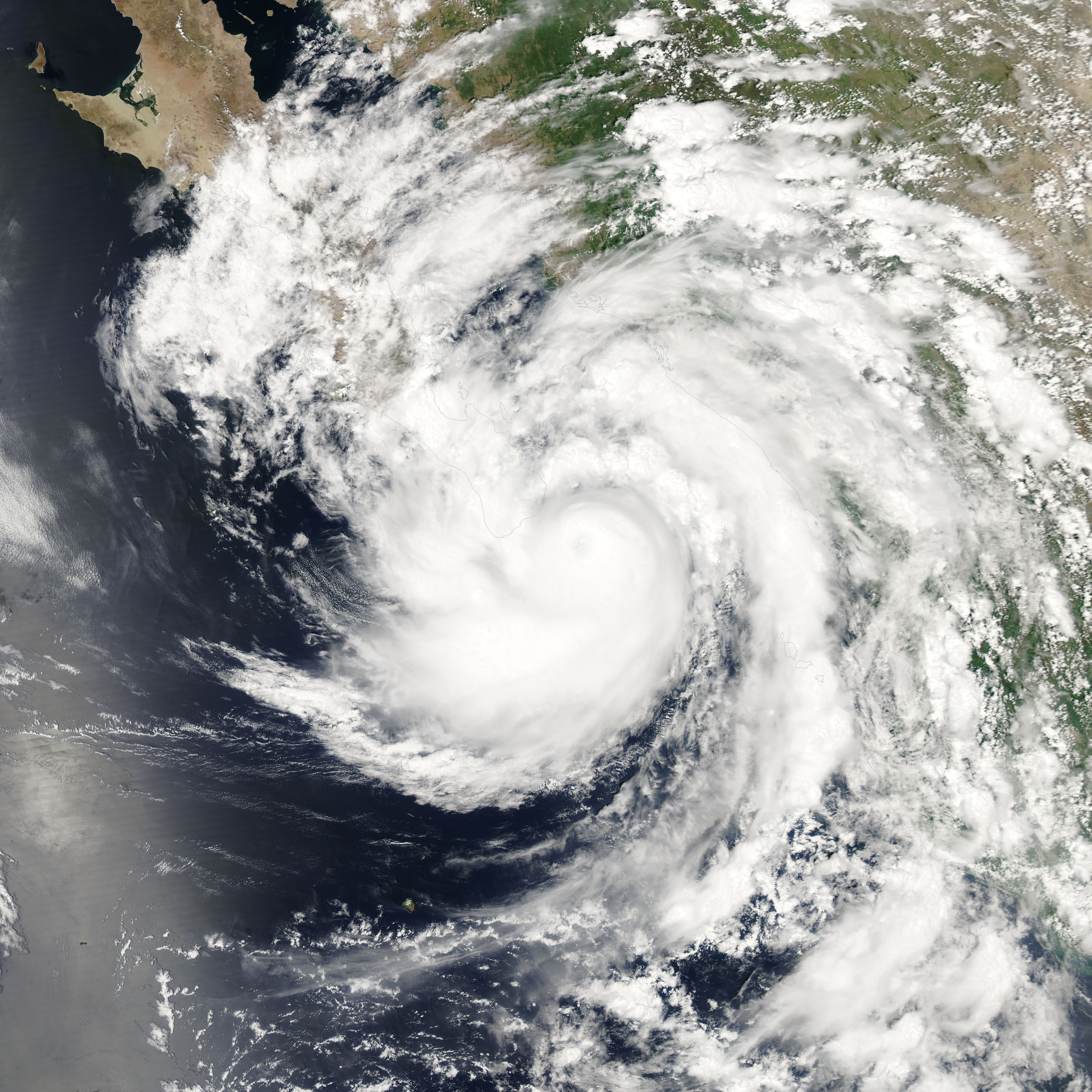
Hurricane John, September 2006

- August 14–15, 2000: Tropical Storm Ileana briefly threatened the southern areas of the peninsula before suddenly turning out to sea. Large waves caused by the storm likely impacted the coast of that area. No damage or deaths were reported.
- September 2000: Moisture from Tropical Storm Norman produced light rainfall across the peninsula.
- September 15–17, 2000: The outer rainbands of Tropical Storm Miriam brought 7.68 in (195 mm) at Los Cobos. Throughout the country, total damages from the storm amounted to $7.2 million (MXN; $558,000 2000 USD. On October 24, a national disaster declaration was signed for areas affected by Tropical Storm Miriam in the state.
- September 30, 2001: Tropical Storm Juliette made landfall near San Carlos. It caused damage and heavy rainfall throughout the peninsula; Cabo San Lucas was "clobbered," with it being cut off from the rest of Mexico for several days. Juliette caused two deaths in or near the peninsula. A maximum of 39.8 in (1,010 mm) fell in Caudaño, the highest known total ever recorded from a tropical cyclone in the state.
- September 19, 2002: Tropical Storm Iselle briefly threatened Baja California on September 19 before dissipating about 55 mi (90 km) offshore the next day.
- August 25, 2003: Hurricane Ignacio made landfall on the peninsula. Heavy rains caused a flood that swept two rescue workers to their deaths.
- September 22, 2003: Hurricane Marty made landfall near San Jose del Cabo. A total of 4000 houses were destroyed with disruption to boats in the area. The hurricane was responsible for significant flooding and storm surges, Five deaths were reported and 6,000 people were affected. Total damage from the storm was $100 million.
- Early September 2004: Outer rainbands from Hurricane Howard produced heavy rainfall.
- September 19, 2004: Tropical Depression Javier made landfall on the peninsula. Flooding rains damaged portions of a highway.
- July 19, 2005: Tropical Storm Eugene came within range of the southern tip of the Baja California peninsula. Tropical storm watches were issued for the area around Cabo San Lucas for most of the day, but the storm moved away without affecting land.
- September 30-October 3, 2005: Hurricane Otis approached close to the peninsula. Flooding was the only impact.
- July 27–28, 2006: Tropical Storm Emilia passed close to the peninsula, causing isolated reports of gale-force winds and minor flooding and damage.
- August 26, 2006: Rip currents from Hurricane Ileana kill a man near Cabo San Lucas.
- September 2, 2006: Hurricane John made landfall on the peninsula. Winds and rain caused heavy damage throughout the peninsula. John killed five people. Damage in Mexico amounted to $663 million (2006 MXN, $60.8 million 2006 USD).
- October 23–25, 2006: Tropical Storm Paul passed close to the peninsula. High surf caused two deaths.
- July 2007: As a weakening tropical storm, Tropical Storm Dalila produced rough seas and heavy rains over parts of Baja California Sur.
- September 2007: Hurricane Henriette caused a person to drown in the surf on the south of the peninsula. Henriette made landfall just east of Cabo San Lucas with winds of 80 mph (130 km/h).
- September 2007: The remnants of Hurricane Ivo produced rain without any major impact.
- August 25, 2008: Tropical Storm Julio made landfall on the peninsula, causing flooding that killed one person.
- September 11, 2008: Tropical Depression Lowell made landfall on the peninsula. No damage was reported.
- October 11, 2008: Hurricane Norbert became the strongest hurricane to hit the western side of the Peninsula. Two towns were nearly completely damaged, with heavy flooding and storm surges reported. The worst damage occurred in the municipality of Comondú, where 16,000 residents reported damage to their homes.
- September 2, 2009: Hurricane Jimena tied Norbert's short-lived record as one of the most intense hurricanes to make landfall on the Pacific side of the peninsula. Before the arrival of Jimena, civil defense authorities in Los Cabos announced that they would have to evacuate 20,000 families from their homes. The storm later caused widespread flooding and damage and killed one person. Damage from the storm amounted to MXN$800 million (US$59.8 million). A total of 35,000 were reported to have been left homeless.
- Early October 2009: The remnants of Tropical Storm Olaf caused rain on the peninsula.
- October 14, 2009: Tropical Storm Patricia threatened the peninsula's southern tip without causing any appreciable impact.
- October 18 and 19, 2009: Waves from Hurricane Rick killed two people on the peninsula.

=== 2010s ===
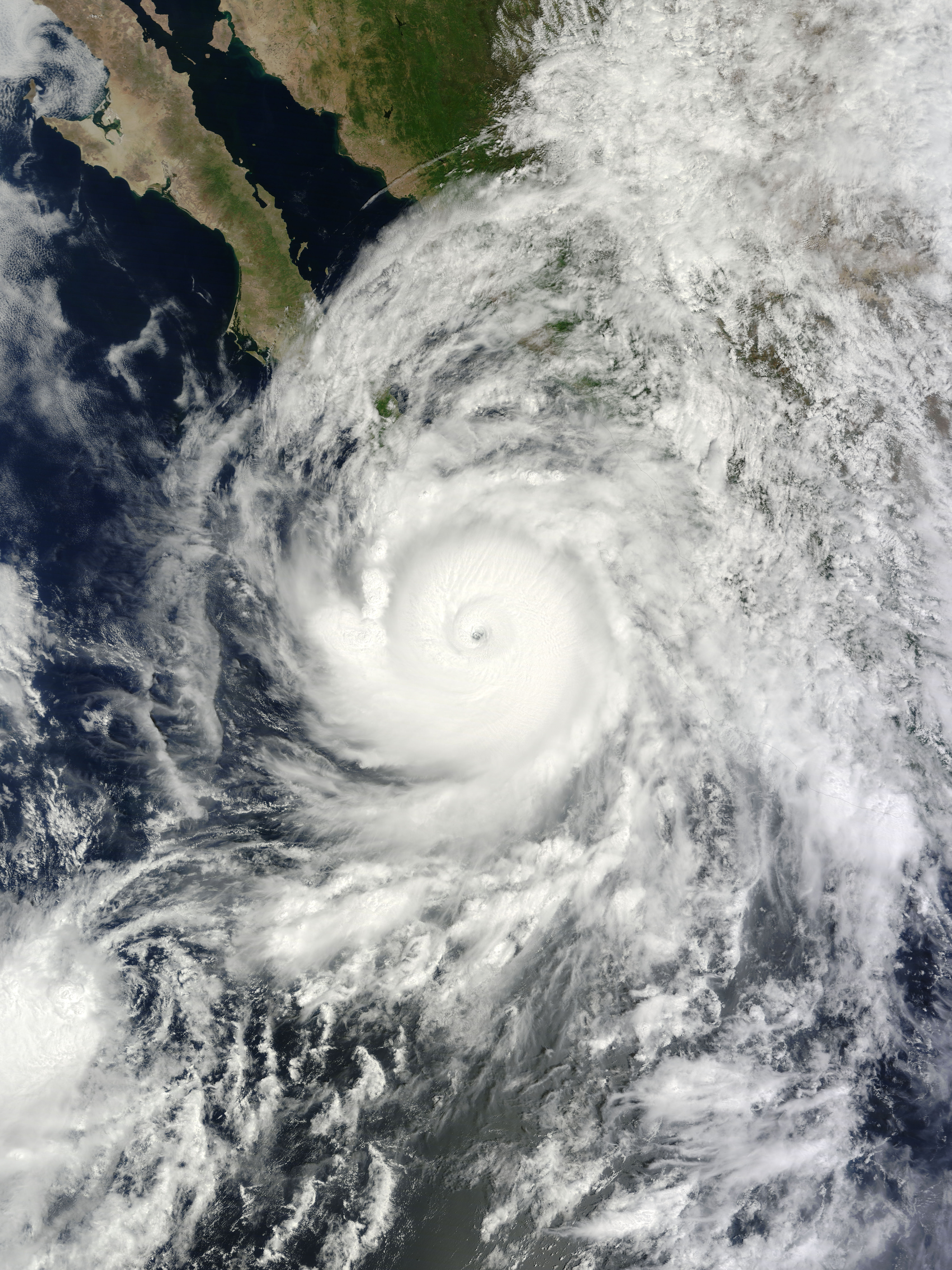
Hurricane Odile, September 2014

- September 20, 2010: Tropical Storm Georgette made landfall near San Jose del Cabo.
- July 2011: Tropical cyclone warnings and watches were briefly posted for the coasts of Baja California Sur during Hurricane Dora. The watch was discontinued two days later.
- Mid-August 2012: 400 people were evacuated in Los Cabos due to flooding from Tropical Storm Hector. One hundred people were left homeless.
- September 3, 2012: Moisture from short-lived Tropical Storm John brought some rain and wind to the region.
- September 18, 2012: The remnants of Tropical Storm Kristy prompted wind warnings for the area.
- September 24–26, 2012: Moisture from Hurricane Miriam affected the Baja California Peninsula.
- September 28, 2012: Tropical Storm Norman brought extremely heavy rains to the southern portion of the peninsula. At least 24 cars were swept away.
- October 15–18, 2012: Hurricane Paul approached the region as a major hurricane. Paul brought landslides and flooding to the Baja California Peninsula. Damage to roads was estimated at MX$200 million (US$15.5 million). Approximately 580 families reported property damage caused by Hurricane Paul; many homes across the region were left without electricity and running water.
- September 13, 2014: Hurricane Odile was the most intense tropical cyclone to make landfall over the Baja California Peninsula in the satellite era. The storm caused five deaths on Baja, and ten deaths were recorded elsewhere. Damages were around MX$16.6 billion (US$1.22 billion).
- September 6, 2016: Hurricane Newton brought very heavy rains and winds of 90 mph (150 km/h) to the southern areas of the peninsula.
- September 2, 2017: Tropical Storm Lidia makes landfall near Punta Marquez. Severe flooding is reported and at least seven people are killed.
- June 14–15, 2018: Hurricane Bud hit the Baja California Peninsula as a tropical storm.
- September 19–20, 2018: Tropical Depression Nineteen-E formed in the Gulf of California caused heavy rains before it dissipated the next day over the mountainous terrain of Sonora.
- October 1–2, 2018: Hurricane Rosa weakened to a tropical depression as it made landfall in the Baja California Peninsula.
- October 12, 2018: Hurricane Sergio made landfall in Baja California Sur as a tropical storm before quickly weakening due to land interaction.
- August 24, 2019: Rainfall from Tropical Storm Ivo triggers several landslides in San José del Cabo.
- September 20, 2019: Hurricane Lorena made landfall in the southern portion of Baja California as a Category 1 hurricane.

=== 2020s ===
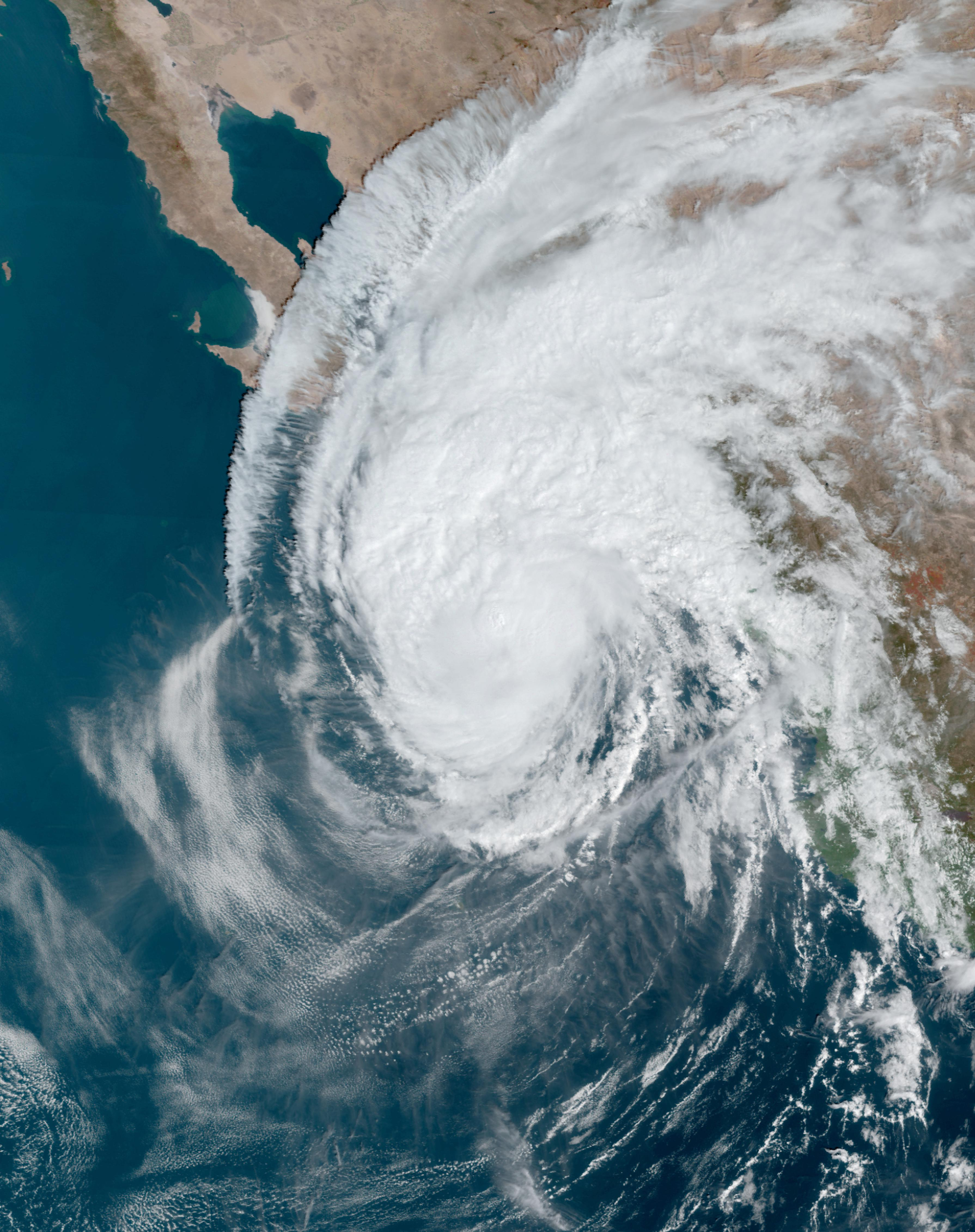
Hurricane Norma, October 2023

- September 9, 2021: Hurricane Olaf made landfall in the Baja California Sur as a Category 2 hurricane.
- September 3, 2022: Tropical Storm Javier brings heavy rain and gusty winds to the peninsula.
- September 8, 2022: Hurricane Kay made landfall along the Vizcaíno Peninsula with 75 mph (120 km/h) winds, then weakened to a tropical storm, before moving back over the ocean.
- August 20, 2023: Hurricane Hilary's eye briefly touched the mainland at Punta Eugenia, before passing over Natividad and Cedros. It later made landfall with tropical storm-force winds in San Quintín, Baja California, before tracking north-northwestward over parts of Southern California, briefly delivering above-average rainfall and high winds onto Los Angeles, Orange and San Diego Counties. Some low-lying areas experienced flooding issues.
- October 21, 2023: Hurricane Norma made landfall in Baja California Sur as a Category 1 hurricane.
- August 6, 2024: Tropical Storm Fabio brings heavy rain to the Los Cabos Municipality as it passes offshore.
- September 14, 2024: Tropical Storm Ileana brushes the southern part of the peninsula, bringing heavy rain that triggered several mudslides.
- September 4, 2025: The outer rain bands from Hurricane Lorena cause flooding in San José del Cabo.
- September 15, 2025: The outer rain bands from Tropical Storm Mario bring heavy rain to San Ignacio. A man is fatally electrocuted during the storm's passage.
- October 8, 2025: Hurricane Priscilla brings heavy rain and strong winds to parts of Baja California Sur as it weakened offshore. Flooding, fallen trees, and power outages were reported.
- October 12, 2025: Tropical Storm Raymond degenerates to a remnant low just south of the peninsula. Heavy rainfall caused flooding and sinkholes.

== Listed by month ==
Most tropical cyclone impacts occurred in the month of September. This coincides with the statistical peak in the eastern north Pacific hurricane season, which occurs in early September or late August. Although hurricane season in the eastern north Pacific officially runs from May 15 to November 30, no known tropical cyclones have impacted the peninsula in May, November, or outside the season except Hurricane Blanca in May 2015.

Number of recorded storms affecting the Baja California peninsula, by month of year
| Month | Number of storms |
|---|---|
| January | 0 |
| February | 0 |
| March | 0 |
| April | 0 |
| May | 0 |
| June | 3 |
| July | 10 |
| August | 19 |
| September | 56 |
| October | 22 |
| November | 0 |
| December | 0 |

== Deadly systems ==
As many tropical cyclones impact the peninsula, sometimes when rather intense, deaths frequently occur.

| Name | Year | Number of deaths |
|---|---|---|
| Liza | 1976 | 435-600+ |
| Unnamed | 1918 | 25 |
| Unnamed | 1941 | 15 |
| Lidia | 2017 | 7 |
| Marty | 2003 | 5 |
| John | 2006 | 5 |
| Odile | 2014 | 5 |
| Pauline | 1968 | 4-5 |
| Newton | 2016 | 2 |
| Flossie | 1995 | 2 |
| Nora | 1997 | 2 |
| Juliette | 2001 | 2 |
| Ignacio | 2003 | 2 |
| Paul | 2006 | 2 |
| Rick | 2009 | 2 |
| Fausto | 1996 | 1 |
| Ileana | 2006 | 1 |
| Henriette | 2007 | 1 |
| Julio | 2008 | 1 |
| Jimena | 2009 | 1 |
| Mario | 2025 | 1 |
| Ismael | 1995 | 0-57 |
| Isis | 1998 | 0-18 |

== Tropical cyclone warnings and watches ==
If a tropical cyclone threatens to bring tropical storm or hurricane conditions to areas in the Baja California Peninsula, the government issues tropical cyclone warnings and watches for the threatened areas. The watches and warnings will be issued in coastal area between internationally recognized points known as breakpoints. The Baja California Peninsula has twenty-two breakpoints, running from the United States-Mexico border, south along the Pacific coast to Cabo San Lucas, and north along the Gulf of California coast to Calamajue. However, tropical cyclones can still bring dangerous conditions such as flooding to areas not covered by warnings and watches.

== See also ==
- List of California hurricanes
- List of Pacific hurricanes
- Pacific hurricane season
