= 1941 Cabo San Lucas hurricane =

Pacific hurricane in 1941

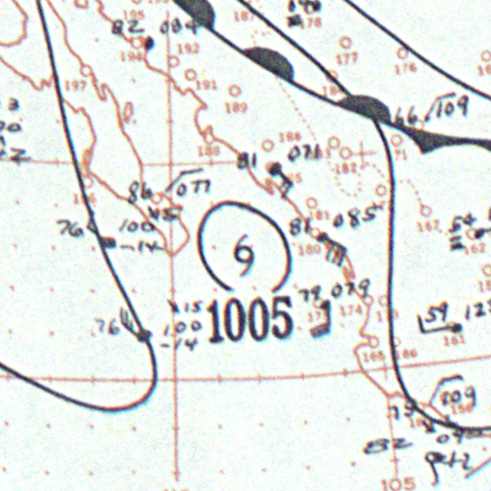
- Surface weather analysis of the hurricane on September 10

Meteorological history
- Formed: September 8, 1941
- Dissipated: September 13, 1941

Category 1 hurricane
- 1-minute sustained (SSHWS/NWS)
- Highest winds: 85 mph (140 km/h)
- Lowest pressure: 1001 mbar (hPa); 29.56 inHg

Overall effects
- Fatalities: 15
- Areas affected: Baja California Peninsula, California
- Part of the 1941 Pacific hurricane season

The 1941 Cabo San Lucas hurricane is considered one of the worst tropical cyclones on record to affect Cabo San Lucas. The hurricane was first reported on September 8 off the coast of Mexico. It slowly moved northwestward while intensifying. After peaking in intensity, it entered the Gulf of California, and weakened rapidly. It dissipated on September 13.

This system brought winds and heavy rain to the southern tip of the Baja California Peninsula. The hurricane destroyed poorer sections of La Paz and its nearby villages. Two villages were completely destroyed. Furthermore, Cabo San Lucas was devastated. The torrential rains damaged roads and left thousands homeless. In addition, the hurricane destroyed the tuna canning industry in San José del Cabo. Throughout the devastated peninsula, 15 people were killed, and many others were injured. Initially following the storm, Cabo San Lucas was abandoned, but after World War II, most of the destroyed buildings were rebuilt. The remnants of the storm later brought rains to California and Arizona, peaking at 3.54 in (90 mm) at Mormon Lake.

== Meteorological history ==
A tropical storm was first reported on September 8, 1941. The storm quickly intensified, becoming a mid-level tropical storm the next day while attaining its lowest reported pressure of 1,001.4 mbar (29.57 inHg). It slowly moved northwestward, and entered the Gulf of California. Subsequently, the hurricane made landfall along the southern portion of Baja California Sur, with winds of 85 mph (135 km/h). This made the hurricane a Category 1 on the modern-day Saffir-Simpson hurricane wind scale. Even though the Monthly Weather Review reported that the hurricane was last observed on September 12, the storm is presumed to have weakened thereafter as it moved up the coast and by September 13, only a swirl of clouds remained.

== Impact and aftermath ==
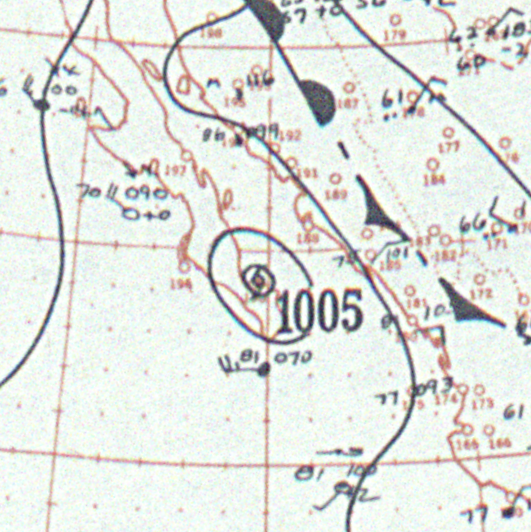
Weather map of the hurricane making landfall on September 11

Throughout the peninsula, 15 people were killed, and many were injured. According to press reports from Mexico City, the hurricane was considered the worst system to affect the state since the dawn of the 20th century.

The port town of Cabo San Lucas was washed away and mostly destroyed due to flooding. The storm brought "great loss of life" to the city. Furthermore, the hurricane destroyed a tuna packaging plant. In all, this hurricane is regarded as one of the worst tropical cyclones to affect the city. Initially following the system, activities among the surrounding areas of the village ceased; throughout World War II, Cabo San Lucas was essentially abandoned, but most of the buildings destroyed were rebuilt following the war. Because of the damage caused by the system, the Cabo San Lucas Bay was forced to relocate 1 mi (1.6 km) inland from its initial location.

Strong winds and heavy rain lashed the southern tip of the Baja California Peninsula for 48 hours, lasting until late September 12. The wind destroyed poorer sections of La Paz and nearby villages. Two villages, Santiago and Triunfo, were completely destroyed. The torrential rains damaged many highways across the peninsula and left thousands homeless. The tuna canning industry declined rapidly in San José del Cabo following the hurricane because the storm had damaged the equipment needed for the industry. According to personal accounts, a famous church was destroyed in Todos Santos. Moisture from the Cabo San Lucas hurricane of 1941 later passed into the Southwestern United States, where it caused up to 1 in (25 mm) of rain in the mountains and deserts of California. Further east, the storm brought heavy rains to portions of Arizona, peaking at 3.54 in (90 mm) at Mormon Lake. Four other weather stations recorded more than 2 in (51 mm).

== See also ==
- Hurricane Ignacio (2003)
- Hurricane Marty (2003)
- List of Baja California Peninsula hurricanes
