= Puerto Chale =

Coordinates: 24°25′21″N 111°33′12″W

Puerto Chale is a town located on the Pacific coast side of La Paz Municipality in the Mexican state of Baja California Sur. Hurricane Norbert made landfall in Puerto Chale on October 11, 2008, with 105 mph winds, a Category 2 hurricane. It had a population of 373 inhabitants in the 2010 census and is located at an elevation of 1 meter (3 ft.) above sea level.
