= Timeline of the 1997 Pacific hurricane season =

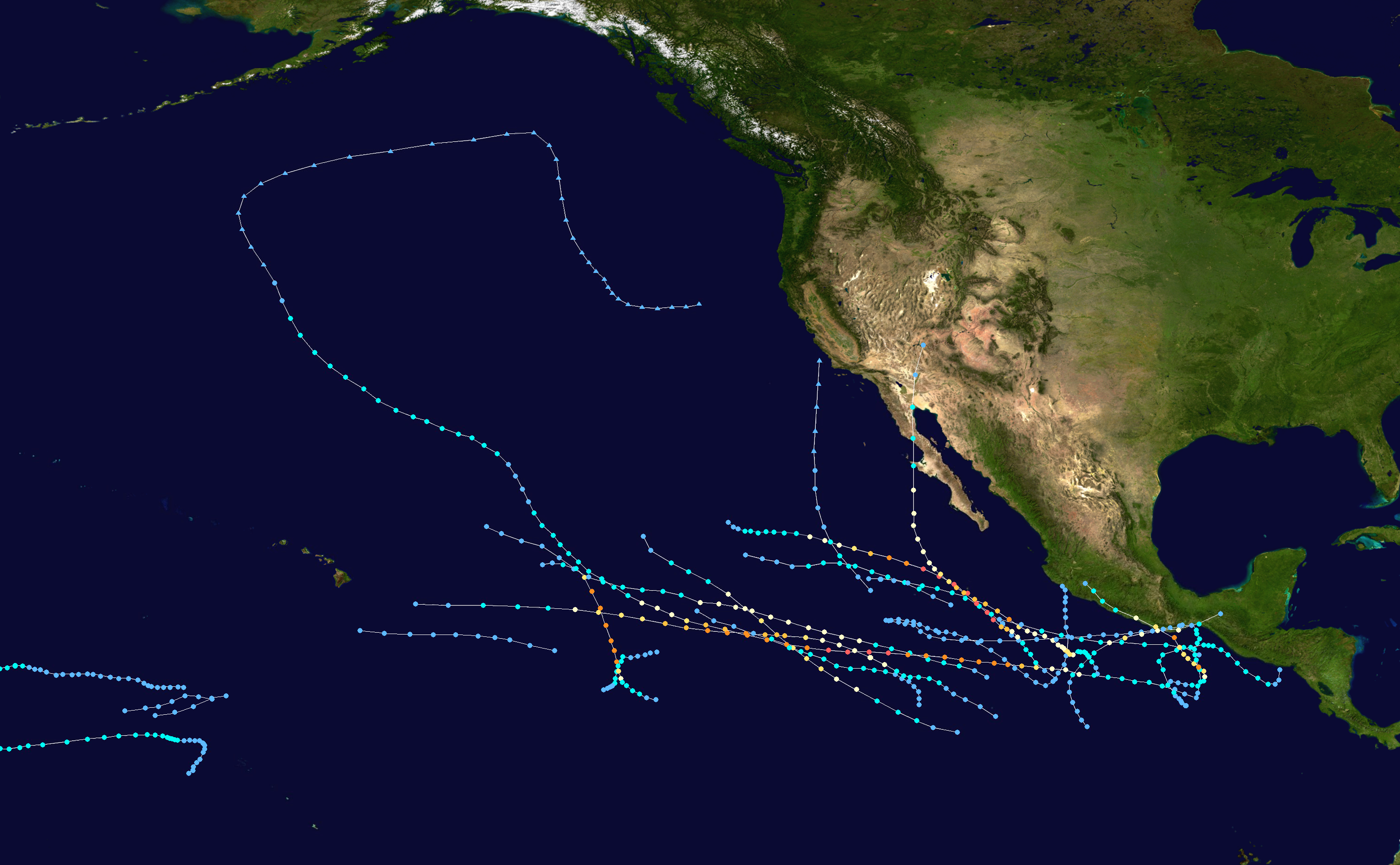
- Season summary map

Season boundaries
- First system formed: June 1, 1997
- Last system dissipated: December 6, 1997 (Note: The last storm, Paka, did not dissipate on December 6. It crossed into the Western Pacific, and because it was the final storm of the season, the crossover date is listed on here as the dissipation date.)

Strongest system
- Name: Linda
- Maximum winds: 185 mph (295 km/h) (1-minute sustained)
- Lowest pressure: 902 mbar (hPa; 26.64 inHg)

Longest lasting system
- Name: Guillermo and Olaf
- Duration: 16.5 days
Storm articles
- Hurricane Guillermo (1997)
- Typhoon Oliwa
- Hurricane Linda (1997)
- Hurricane Nora (1997)
- Tropical Storm Olaf (1997)
- Hurricane Pauline
- Hurricane Rick (1997)
- Typhoon Paka

The 1997 Pacific hurricane season was the annual cycle of tropical cyclone formation over the Pacific Ocean north of the equator and east of the International Date Line (IDL). The season officially began on May 15 in the Eastern Pacific basin proper (east of 140°W) and June 1 in the Central Pacific basin (140°W to the IDL), and ended on November 30 in both areas. This is historically the period during which most tropical cyclogenesis occurs in these respective areas. The season's first system, Tropical Storm Andres, developed on June 1; its last, Tropical Storm Paka, crossed the IDL on December 6.

The 1997 season produced a slightly above-average number of named storms (19) and a near-average number of hurricanes (nine). (Note: During the period from 1991 to 2020, an average Pacific hurricane season generated 15 tropical storms, eight hurricanes, and four major hurricanes.) The number of major hurricanes—Category 3 or higher on the five-level Saffir–Simpson scale—was well above average, with seven. (Note: This figure excludes Oliwa and Paka. They were tropical storms east of the IDL, but reached intensities equivalent to Category 5 status west of the IDL.) Two of them—Guillermo and Linda—reached Category 5 intensity, with Linda becoming the strongest Pacific hurricane on record at the time. There also were five tropical depressions that did not reach tropical storm strength. The Central Pacific basin was unusually busy, as nine tropical cyclones either formed or existed in the region. At the time, this was the fourth-most in one year since satellites launched in 1961. Five tropical cyclones made landfall this season, beginning with the June landfall of Andres in El Salvador as a tropical depression. Then, from September to November, four consecutive named storms struck Mexico: Olaf as a tropical depression, Nora and Rick at Category 1 strength, and Pauline as a high-end Category 2 hurricane. Pauline was particularly impactful, causing floods and mudslides that killed over 200 people and inflicted catastrophic damage.

This timeline documents tropical cyclone formations, strengthening, weakening, landfalls, extratropical transitions, and dissipations during the season. It includes information that was not released during the season, meaning that data from post-storm reviews by the National Hurricane Center and the Central Pacific Hurricane Center has been included.

The time stamp for each event is first stated using Coordinated Universal Time (UTC), the 24-hour clock where 00:00 = midnight UTC. The NHC uses both UTC and the time zone where the center of the tropical cyclone was then located. Prior to 2015, two time zones were utilized in the Eastern Pacific basin: Pacific for the Eastern Pacific, and Hawaii−Aleutian for the Central Pacific. In this timeline, the respective area time is included in parentheses. Additionally, figures for maximum sustained winds and position estimates are rounded to the nearest 5 units (miles, or kilometers), following NHC practice. Direct wind observations are rounded to the nearest whole number. Atmospheric pressures are listed to the nearest millibar and nearest hundredth of an inch of mercury.

== Timeline of events ==
=== May ===
May 15

- The 1997 Eastern Pacific hurricane season officially begins.

=== June ===
June 1

- The 1997 Central Pacific hurricane season officially begins.
- 00:00 UTC (5:00 p.m. PDT, May 31) at 10.4°N 95.4°W – Tropical Depression One-E forms from an area of unsettled weather about 345 mi (555 km) south of the Gulf of Tehuantepec.

June 2

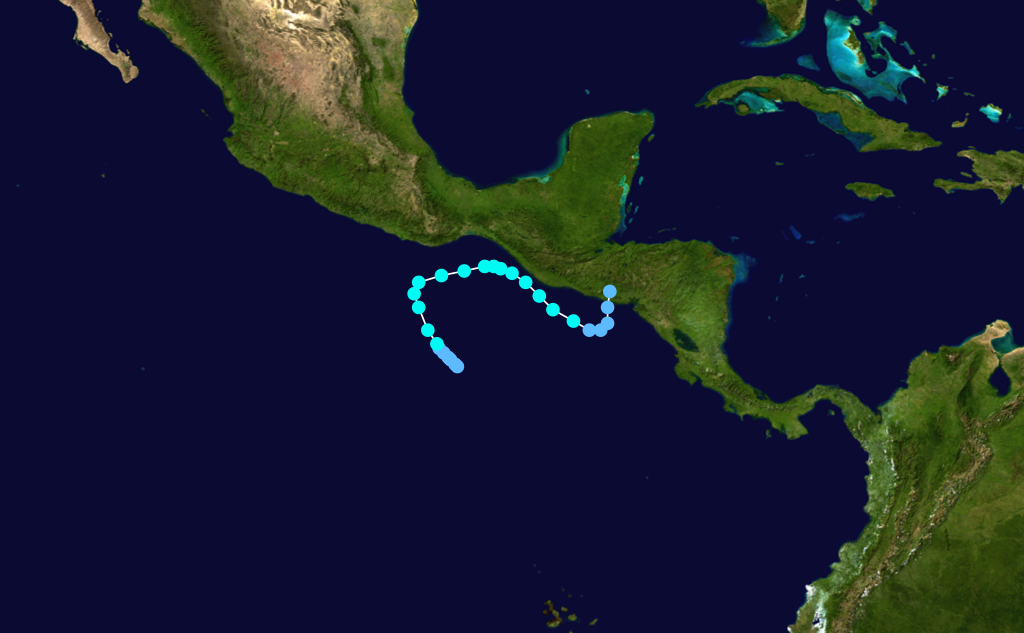
Storm path of Tropical Storm Andres

- 12:00 UTC (5:00 a.m. PDT) at 11.4°N 96.3°W – Tropical Depression One-E strengthens into Tropical Storm Andres about 330 mi (530 km) south of the Gulf of Tehuantepec.

June 4

- 18:00 UTC (11:00 a.m. PDT) at 14.7°N 93.5°W – Tropical Storm Andres attains its peak intensity, with maximum sustained winds of 50 mph (85 km/h) and a minimum central pressure of 998 mbar (29.47 inHg), about 130 mi (215 km) southeast of the Gulf of Tehuantepec.

June 6

- 06:00 UTC (11:00 p.m. PDT, June 5) at 12.0°N 89.6°W – Tropical Storm Andres weakens into a tropical depression about 120 mi (195 km) south-southwest of San Salvador.

June 7

- 01:00 UTC (6:00 p.m. PDT, June 6) at 13.2°N 88.8°W – Tropical Depression Andres makes landfall about 45 mi (75 km) southeast of San Salvador with sustained winds of 30 mph (45 km/h) and a central pressure of 1003 mbar (29.62 inHg).
- 06:00 UTC (11:00 p.m. PDT, June 6) at 13.7°N 88.7°W – Tropical Depression Andres dissipates inland about 35 mi (55 km) east of San Salvador, over the mountainous terrain of Central America.

June 9

- 18:00 UTC (11:00 a.m. PDT) at 14.1°N 94.5°W – Tropical Depression Two-E forms from an area of unsettled weather over the Gulf of Tehuantepec.

June 10

- 00:00 UTC (5:00 p.m. PDT, June 9) at 14.6°N 95.6°W – Tropical Depression Two-E strengthens into Tropical Storm Blanca about 90 mi (150 km) southeast of Puerto Ángel, Oaxaca.

June 11

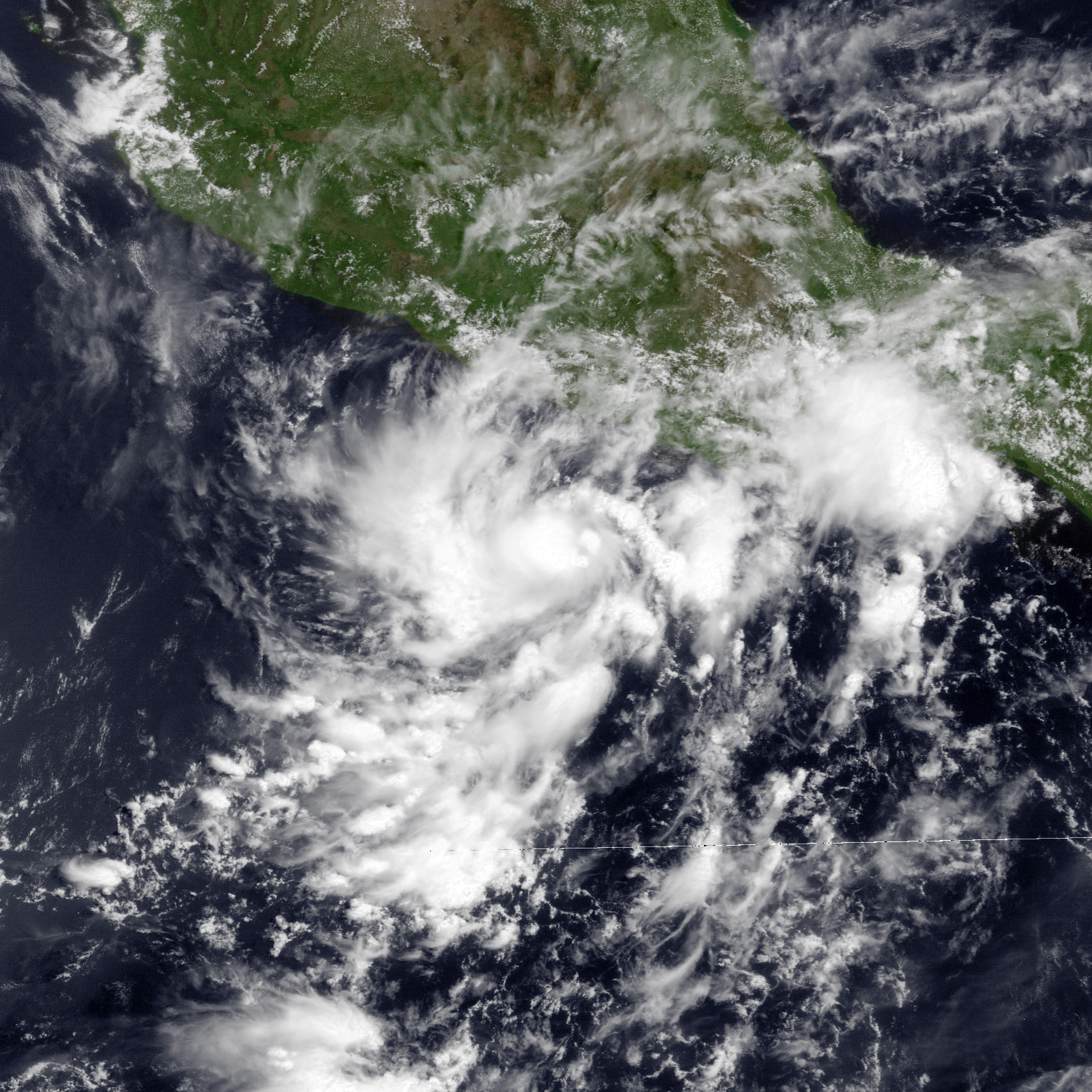
Tropical Storm Blanca near peak intensity late on June 10

- 00:00 UTC (5:00 p.m. PDT, June 10) at 15.0°N 101.5°W – Tropical Storm Blanca attains its peak intensity, with maximum sustained winds of 45 mph (75 km/h) and a minimum central pressure of 1002 mbar (29.59 inHg), about 165 mi (270 km) southwest of Acapulco, Guerrero.

June 12

- 00:00 UTC (5:00 p.m. PDT, June 11) at 16.2°N 107.2°W – Tropical Storm Blanca weakens into a tropical depression about 490 mi (790 km) west of Acapulco.
- 06:00 UTC (11:00 p.m. PDT, June 11) at 16.6°N 108.7°W – Tropical Depression Blanca is last noted as a tropical cyclone about 580 mi (935 km) west of Acapulco, dissipating shortly thereafter.

June 21

- 18:00 UTC (11:00 a.m. PDT) at 14.4°N 117.2°W – Tropical Depression Three-E forms over the central portion of the Eastern Pacific basin. It simultaneously attains its peak intensity, with maximum sustained winds of 35 mph (55 km/h) and a minimum central pressure of 1006 mbar (29.71 inHg).

June 24

- 00:00 UTC (5:00 p.m. PDT, June 23) at 14.6°N 128.4°W – Tropical Depression Three-E is last noted as a tropical cyclone about 750 mi (1,205 km) west of where it formed, dissipating shortly thereafter.

June 25

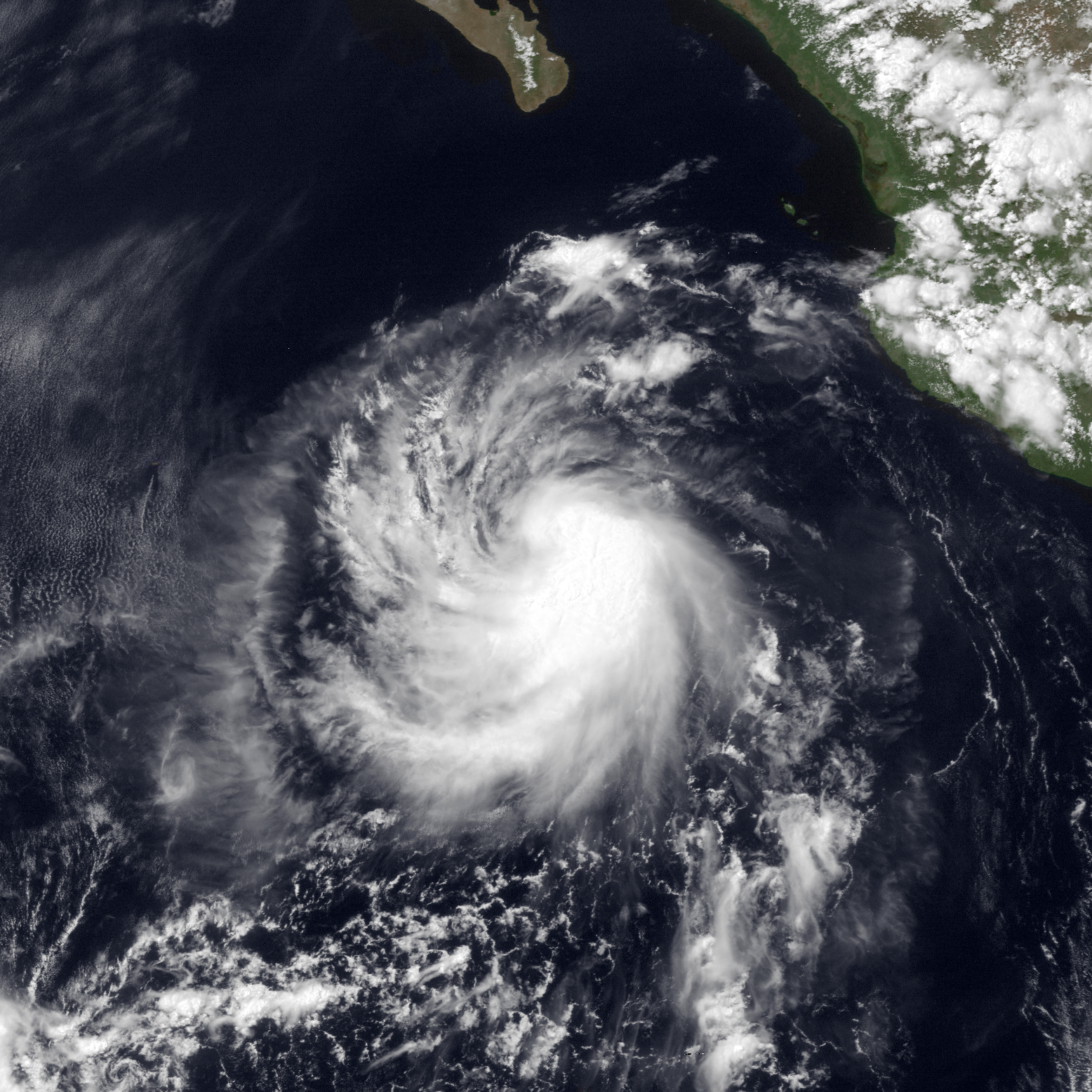
A strengthening Tropical Storm Carlos late on June 25

- 06:00 UTC (11:00 p.m. PDT, June 24) at 15.6°N 107.8°W – A tropical depression forms from an area of unsettled weather about 520 mi (835 km) south-southeast of the southern tip of the Baja California peninsula.
- 18:00 UTC (11:00 a.m. PDT) at 17.0°N 109.3°W – The recently formed tropical depression strengthens into Tropical Storm Carlos about 410 mi (660 km) south of the southern tip of the Baja California peninsula.

June 26

- 06:00 UTC (11:00 p.m. PDT, June 25) at 18.2°N 111.1°W – Tropical Storm Carlos attains its peak intensity, with maximum sustained winds of 50 mph (85 km/h) and a minimum central pressure of 996 mbar (29.41 inHg), about 335 mi (535 km) south-southwest of the southern tip of the Baja California peninsula.

June 27

- 06:00 UTC (11:00 p.m. PDT, June 26) at 19.2°N 115.2°W – Tropical Storm Carlos weakens into a tropical depression about 420 mi (675 km) southwest of the southern tip of the Baja California peninsula.

June 28

- 00:00 UTC (5:00 p.m. PDT, June 27) at 19.5°N 118.0°W – Tropical Depression Carlos is last noted as a tropical cyclone about 570 mi (915 km) west-southwest of the southern tip of the Baja California peninsula, dissipating shortly thereafter.

June 29

- 12:00 UTC (5:00 a.m. PDT) at 13.6°N 109.8°W – Tropical Depression Five-E forms well off the coast of Mexico.

=== July ===
July 2

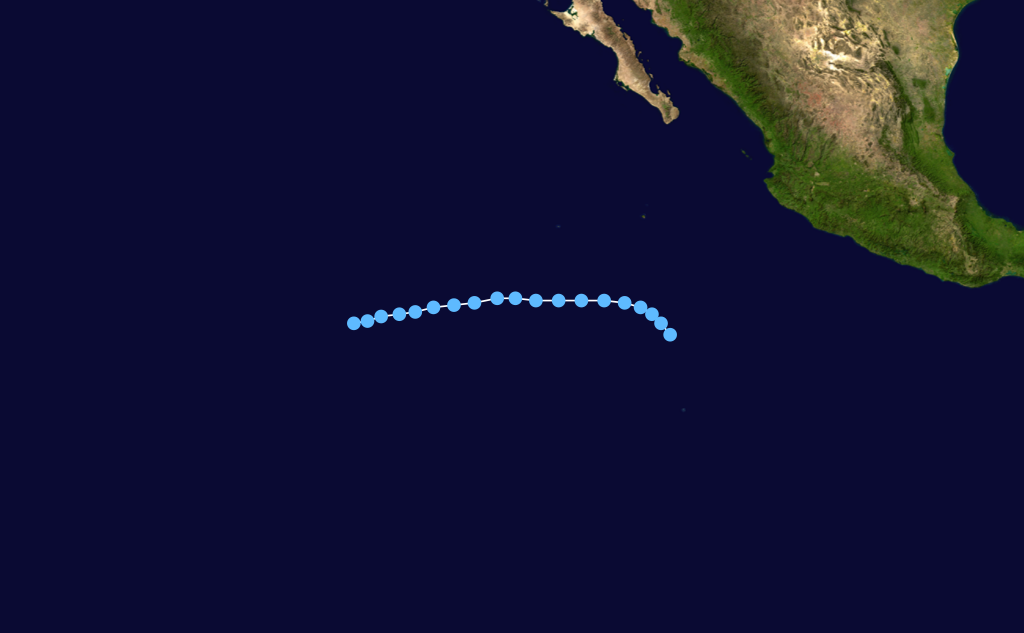
Storm path of Tropical Depression Five-E

- 06:00 UTC (11:00 p.m. PDT, July 1) at 15.0°N 118.4°W – Tropical Depression Five-E attains its peak intensity, with maximum sustained winds of 35 mph (55 km/h) and a minimum central pressure of 1004 mbar (29.65 inHg), about 580 mi (935 km) west of where it formed.

July 4

- 00:00 UTC (5:00 p.m. PDT, July 3) at 14.1°N 123.7°W – Tropical Depression Five-E is last noted as a tropical cyclone about 930 mi (1,500 km) west of where it formed, dissipating shortly thereafter.

July 5

- 12:00 UTC (5:00 a.m. PDT) at 12.5°N 109.6°W – A tropical depression forms from an area of unsettled weather about 720 mi (1,160 km) south of the southern tip of the Baja California peninsula.

July 6

- 00:00 UTC (5:00 p.m. PDT, July 5) at 13.3°N 111.6°W – The recently formed tropical depression strengthens into Tropical Storm Dolores about 665 mi (1,075 km) south of the southern tip of the Baja California peninsula.

July 7

- 12:00 UTC (5:00 a.m. PDT) at 15.1°N 118.7°W – Tropical Storm Dolores strengthens into a Category 1 hurricane about 785 mi (1,260 km) southwest of the southern tip of the Baja California peninsula.

July 9

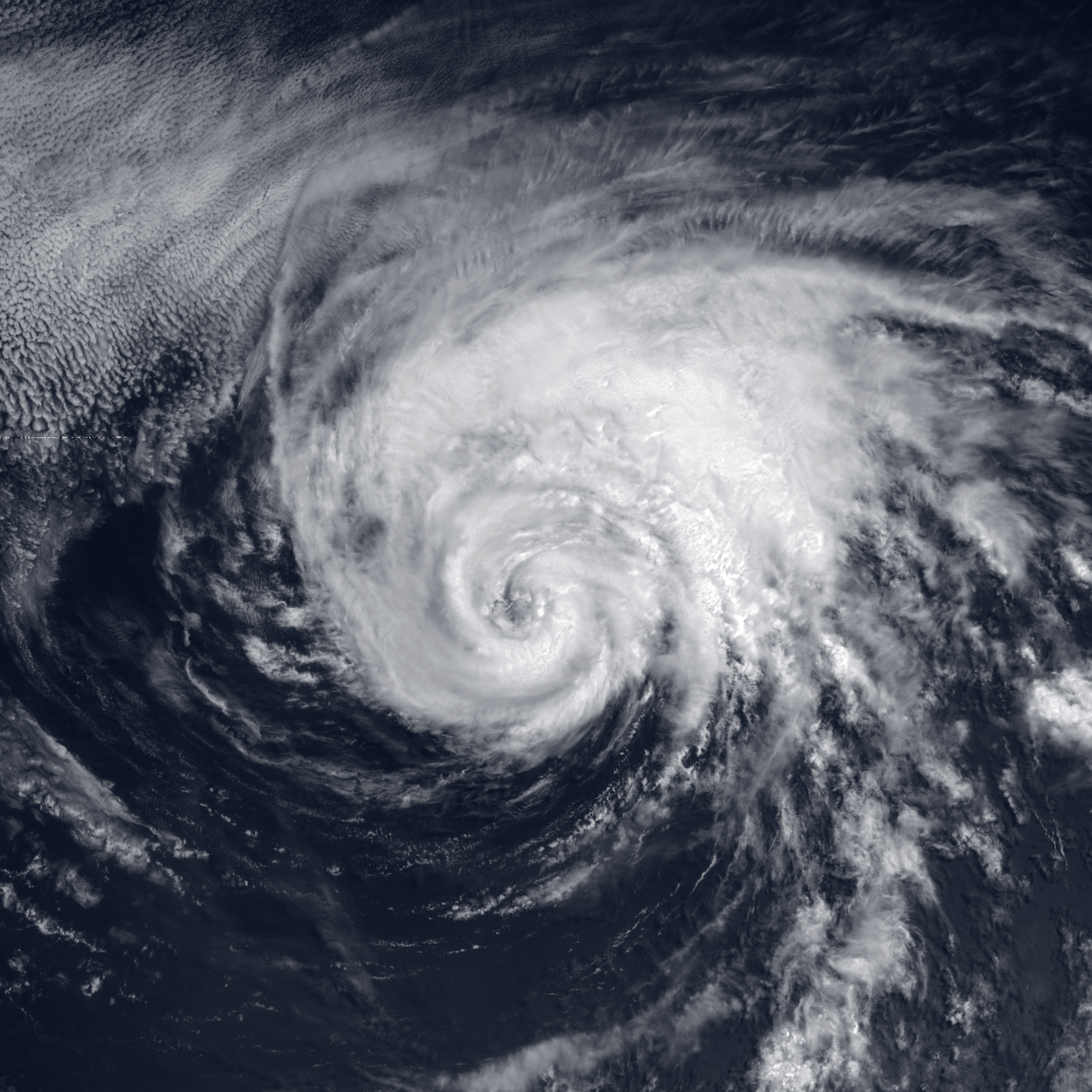
Hurricane Dolores near peak intensity late on July 8

- 06:00 UTC (11:00 p.m. PDT, July 8) at 17.5°N 127.5°W – Hurricane Dolores attains its peak intensity, with maximum sustained winds of 90 mph (150 km/h) and a minimum central pressure of 975 mbar (28.79 inHg), about 1,195 mi (1,925 km) west-southwest of the southern tip of the Baja California peninsula.

July 10

- 06:00 UTC (11:00 p.m. PDT, July 9) at 18.6°N 132.6°W – Hurricane Dolores weakens into a tropical storm about 1,490 mi (2,400 km) west of the southern tip of the Baja California peninsula.

July 11

- 06:00 UTC (11:00 p.m. PDT, July 10) at 19.6°N 138.0°W – Tropical Storm Dolores weakens into a tropical depression about 1,820 mi (2,925 km) west of the southern tip of the Baja California peninsula.
- 18:00 UTC (8:00 a.m. HST) at 21.0°N 140.0°W – Tropical Depression Dolores crosses 140°W, leaving the National Hurricane Center's (NHC) area of responsibility and entering the region monitored by the Central Pacific Hurricane Center (CPHC).

July 12

- 06:00 UTC (11:00 p.m. PDT, July 11) at 8.6°N 111.7°W – A tropical depression forms from a tropical wave about 990 mi (1,595 km) south of the southern tip of the Baja California peninsula.
- 18:00 UTC (8:00 a.m. HST) at 23.2°N 145.2°W – Tropical Depression Dolores dissipates about 2,235 mi (3,595 km) west of the southern tip of the Baja California peninsula.
- 18:00 UTC (11:00 a.m. PDT) at 9.4°N 114.6°W – The recently formed tropical depression strengthens into Tropical Storm Enrique about 980 mi (1,575 km) south-southwest of the southern tip of the Baja California peninsula.

July 13

- 12:00 UTC (5:00 a.m. PDT) at 11.6°N 118.9°W – Tropical Storm Enrique strengthens into a Category 1 hurricane about 980 mi (1,575 km) southwest of the southern tip of the Baja California peninsula.

July 14

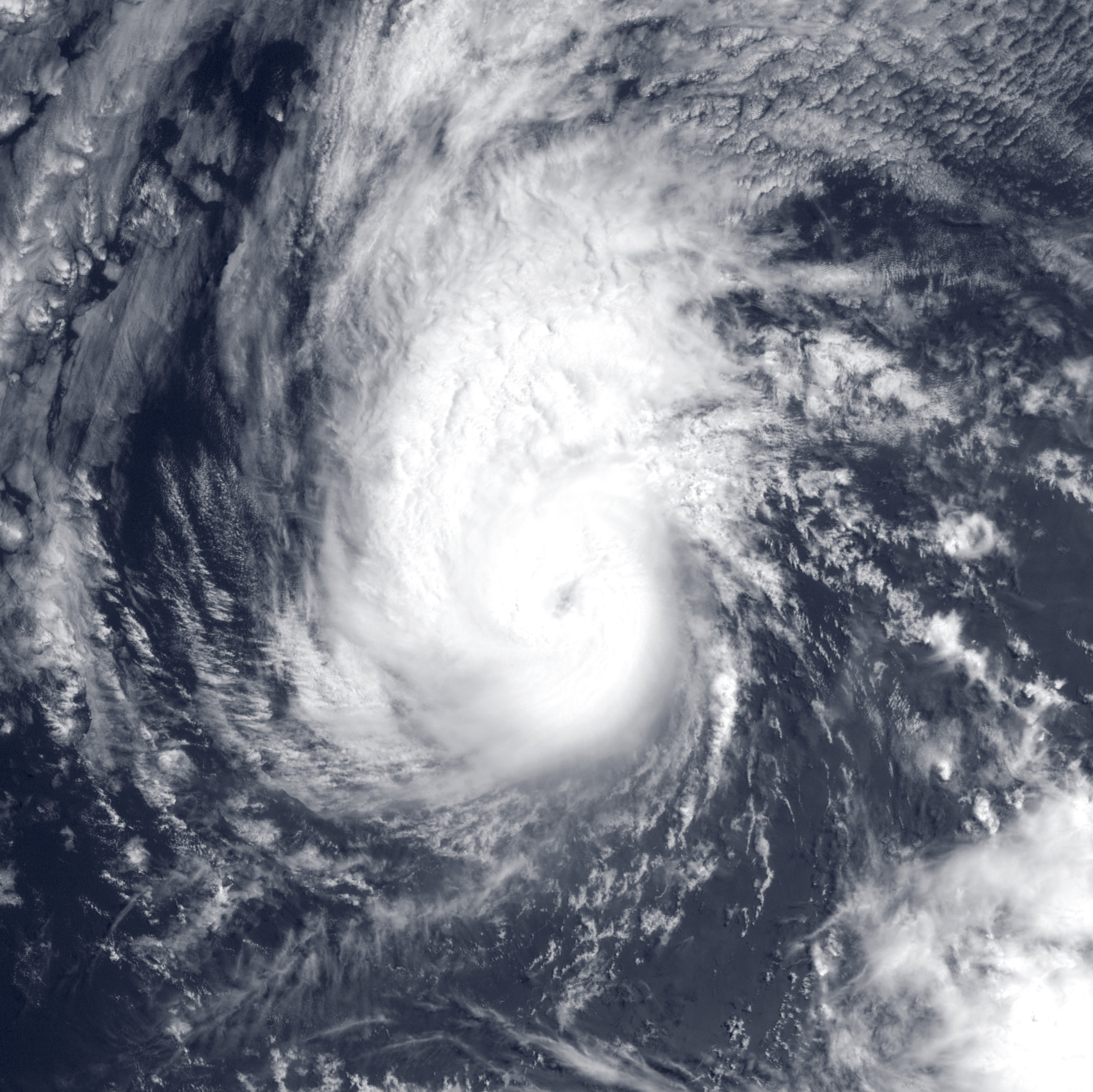
Hurricane Enrique at peak intensity late on July 14

- 00:00 UTC (5:00 p.m. PDT, July 13) at 13.1°N 121.4°W – Hurricane Enrique strengthens to Category 2 intensity about 1,005 mi (1,620 km) southwest of the southern tip of the Baja California peninsula.
- 12:00 UTC (5:00 a.m. PDT) at 9.7°N 109.0°W – Tropical Depression Eight-E forms from an area of unsettled weather about 720 mi (1,160 km) south-southwest of Manzanillo, Colima.
- 18:00 UTC (11:00 a.m. PDT) at 15.5°N 124.5°W – Hurricane Enrique strengthens to Category 3 intensity about 1,075 mi (1,730 km) west-southwest of the southern tip of the Baja California peninsula, making it the first major hurricane of the season. It simultaneously attains its peak intensity, with maximum sustained winds of 115 mph (185 km/h) and a minimum central pressure of 960 mbar (28.35 inHg).

July 15

- 00:00 UTC (5:00 p.m. PDT, July 14) at 16.5°N 125.6°W – Hurricane Enrique weakens to Category 2 intensity about 1,105 mi (1,780 km) west-southwest of the southern tip of the Baja California peninsula.
- 06:00 UTC (11:00 p.m. PDT, July 14) at 17.4°N 126.8°W – Hurricane Enrique weakens to Category 1 intensity about 1,155 mi (1,860 km) west-southwest of the southern tip of the Baja California peninsula.
- 18:00 UTC (11:00 a.m. PDT) at 19.3°N 129.4°W – Hurricane Enrique weakens into a tropical storm about 1,275 mi (2,055 km) west-southwest of the southern tip of the Baja California peninsula.
- 18:00 UTC (11:00 a.m. PDT) at 12.1°N 113.0°W – Tropical Depression Eight-E strengthens into Tropical Storm Felicia about 750 mi (1,205 km) southwest of Manzanillo.

July 16

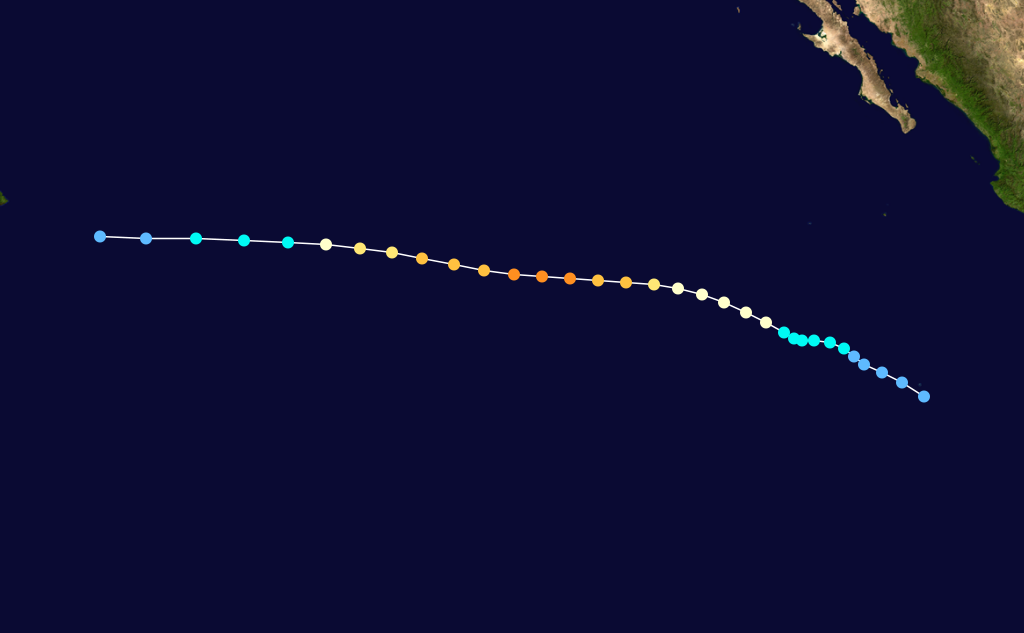
Storm path of Hurricane Felica

- 12:00 UTC (5:00 a.m. PDT) at 21.5°N 133.5°W – Tropical Storm Enrique weakens into a tropical depression about 1,510 mi (2,425 km) west of the southern tip of the Baja California peninsula.
- 18:00 UTC (11:00 a.m. PDT) at 22.5°N 134.0°W – Tropical Depression Enrique dissipates about 1,530 mi (2,465 km) west of the southern tip of the Baja California peninsula.

July 17

- 06:00 UTC (11:00 p.m. PDT, July 16) at 13.4°N 116.9°W – Tropical Storm Felicia strengthens into a Category 1 hurricane about 920 mi (1,480 km) west-southwest of Manzanillo.

July 18

- 12:00 UTC (5:00 a.m. PDT) at 15.3°N 122.5°W – Hurricane Felicia strengthens to Category 2 intensity about 1,225 mi (1,970 km) west-southwest of Manzanillo.
- 18:00 UTC (11:00 a.m. PDT) at 15.4°N 123.9°W – Hurricane Felicia strengthens to Category 3 intensity about 1,320 mi (2,120 km) west of Manzanillo, making it the second major hurricane of the season.

July 19

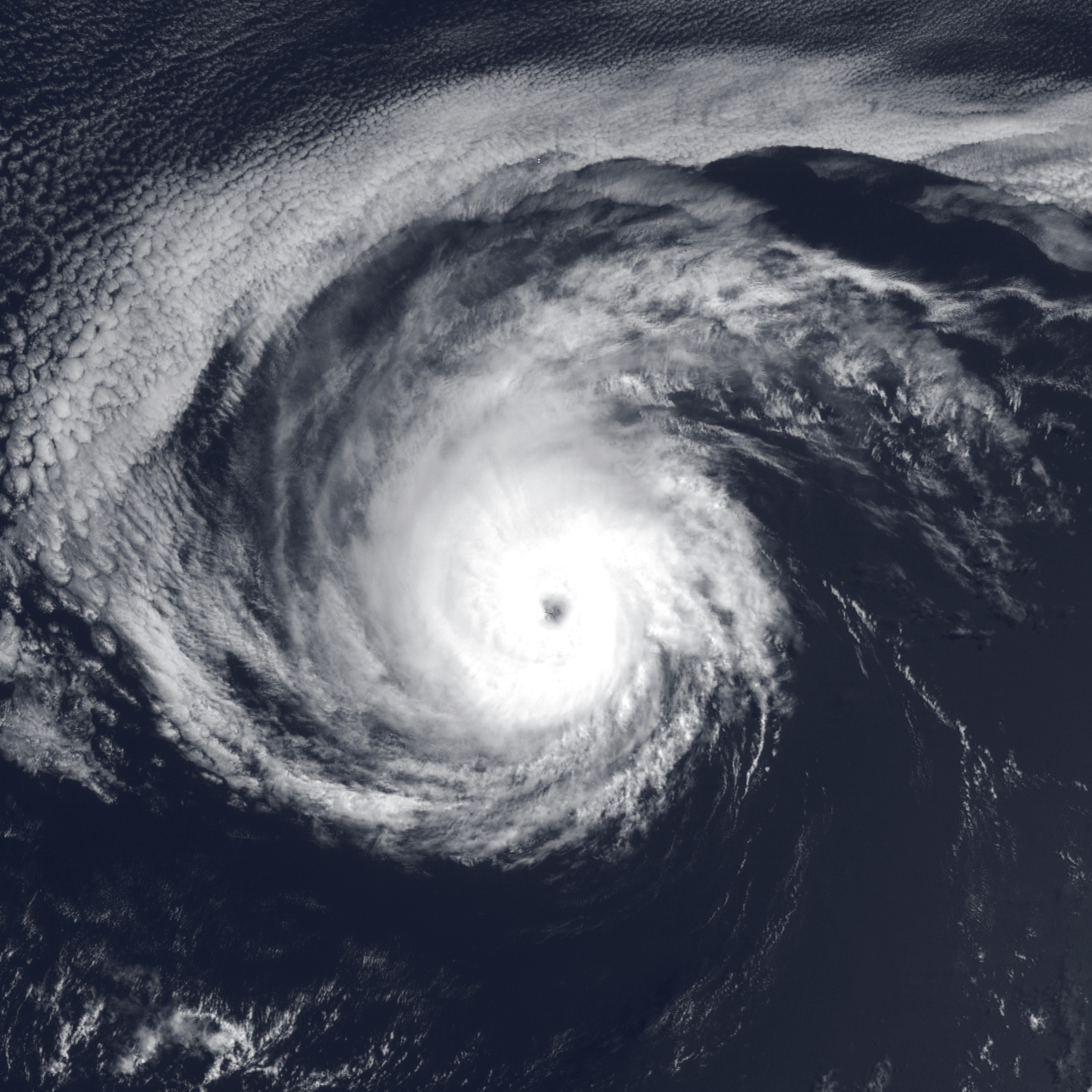
Hurricane Felicia near peak intensity late on July 19

- 06:00 UTC (11:00 p.m. PDT, July 18) at 15.6°N 126.7°W – Hurricane Felicia strengthens to Category 4 intensity about 1,495 mi (2,410 km) west of Manzanillo.
- 12:00 UTC (5:00 a.m. PDT) at 15.7°N 128.1°W – Hurricane Felicia attains its peak intensity, with maximum sustained winds of 130 mph (215 km/h) and a minimum central pressure of 948 mbar (27.99 inHg), about 1,580 mi (2,545 km) west of Manzanillo.

July 20

- 00:00 UTC (5:00 p.m. PDT, July 19) at 16.0°N 131.0°W – Hurricane Felicia weakens to Category 3 intensity about 1,765 mi (2,845 km) west of Manzanillo.
- 18:00 UTC (11:00 a.m. PDT) at 16.9°N 135.6°W – Hurricane Felicia weakens to Category 2 intensity about 2,060 mi (3,315 km) west of Manzanillo.

July 21

- 06:00 UTC (11:00 p.m. PDT, July 20) at 17.3°N 138.9°W – Hurricane Felicia weakens to Category 1 intensity about 2,265 mi (3,650 km) west of Manzanillo.
- 12:00 UTC (2:00 a.m. HST) at 17.4°N 140.8°W – Hurricane Felicia weakens into a tropical storm as it crosses 140°W, leaving the NHC's jurisdiction and entering the CPHC's area of responsibility.

July 22

- 06:00 UTC (8:00 p.m. HST, July 21) at 17.6°N 147.9°W – Tropical Storm Felicia weakens into a tropical depression about 495 mi (795 km) east-southeast of Hilo, Hawaii.
- 12:00 UTC (2:00 a.m. HST) at 17.7°N 150.2°W – Tropical Depression Felicia is last noted as a tropical cyclone about 350 mi (565 km) east-southeast of Hilo, dissipating shortly thereafter.

July 26

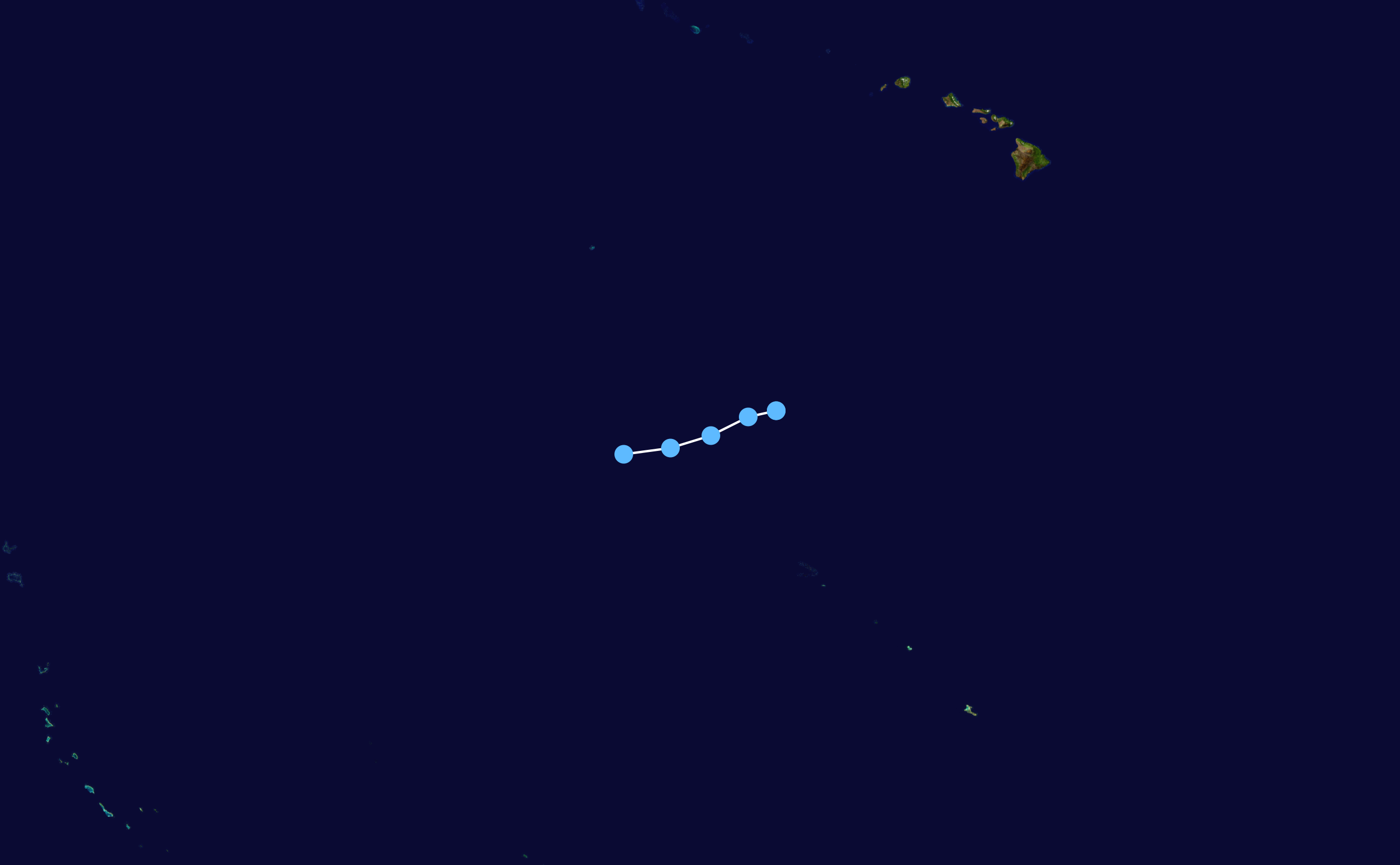
Storm path of Tropical Depression One-C

- 12:00 UTC (2:00 a.m. HST) at 11.5°N 163.6°W – Tropical Depression One-C forms from an area of unsettled weather far to the southwest of Hawaii; it simultaneously attains maximum sustained winds of 35 mph (55 km/h). (Note: While the Northeast and North Central Pacific hurricane database (HURDAT) lists a formation time of 12:00 UTC on July 26 for Tropical Depression One-C, the CPHC stated in their seasonal summary that the system did not develop until 12 hours later.)

July 27

- 18:00 UTC (8:00 a.m. HST) at 10.1°N 168.5°W – Tropical Depression One-C is last noted as a tropical cyclone about 345 mi (555 km) west-southwest of where it formed, dissipating shortly thereafter.

July 30

- 12:00 UTC (5:00 a.m. PDT) at 11.0°N 94.7°W – A tropical depression forms from a tropical wave about 355 mi (575 km) south of Salina Cruz, Oaxaca.

July 31

- 06:00 UTC (11:00 p.m. PDT, July 30) at 11.9°N 97.2°W – The recently formed tropical depression strengthens into Tropical Storm Guillermo about 385 mi (620 km) south-southeast of Acapulco, Guerrero.

=== August ===
August 1

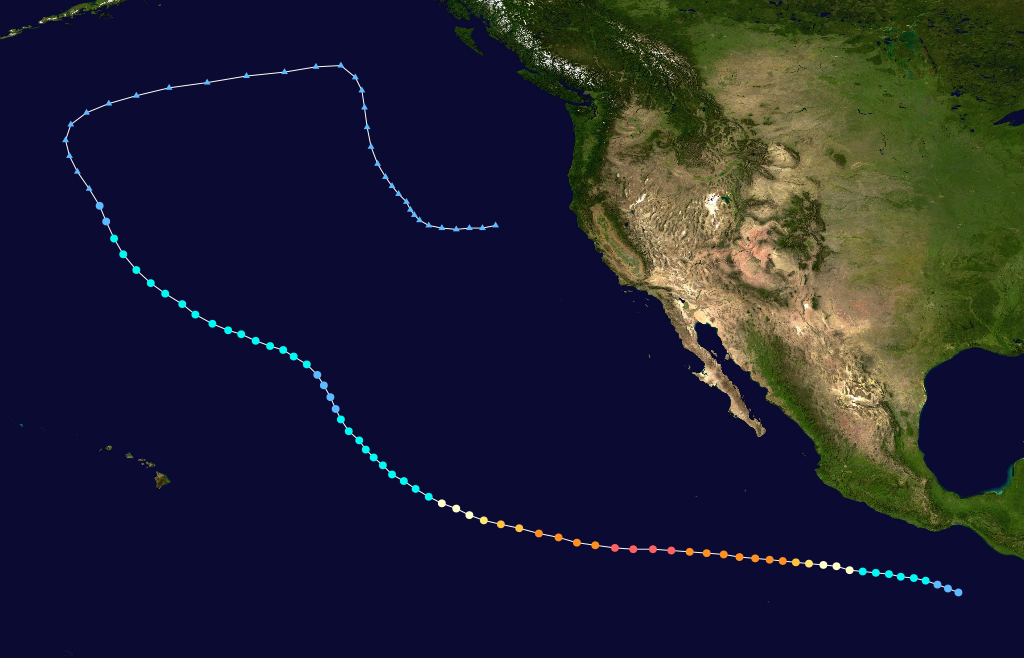
Storm path of Hurricane Guillermo

- 18:00 UTC (11:00 a.m. PDT) at 12.7°N 103.0°W – Tropical Storm Guillermo strengthens into a Category 1 hurricane about 355 mi (575 km) southwest of Acapulco.

August 2

- 12:00 UTC (5:00 a.m. PDT) at 13.2°N 106.1°W – Hurricane Guillermo strengthens to Category 2 intensity about 485 mi (780 km) west-southwest of Acapulco.
- 18:00 UTC (11:00 a.m. PDT) at 13.3°N 107.1°W – Hurricane Guillermo strengthens to Category 3 intensity about 540 mi (870 km) west-southwest of Acapulco, making it the third major hurricane of the season.

August 3

- 00:00 UTC (5:00 p.m. PDT, August 2) at 13.4°N 108.1°W – Hurricane Guillermo strengthens to Category 4 intensity about 600 mi (965 km) west-southwest of Acapulco.

August 4

- 18:00 UTC (11:00 a.m. PDT) at 14.2°N 116.6°W – Hurricane Guillermo strengthens to Category 5 intensity, the first of two such storms during the season, about 740 mi (1,195 km) southwest of the southern tip of the Baja California peninsula.

August 5

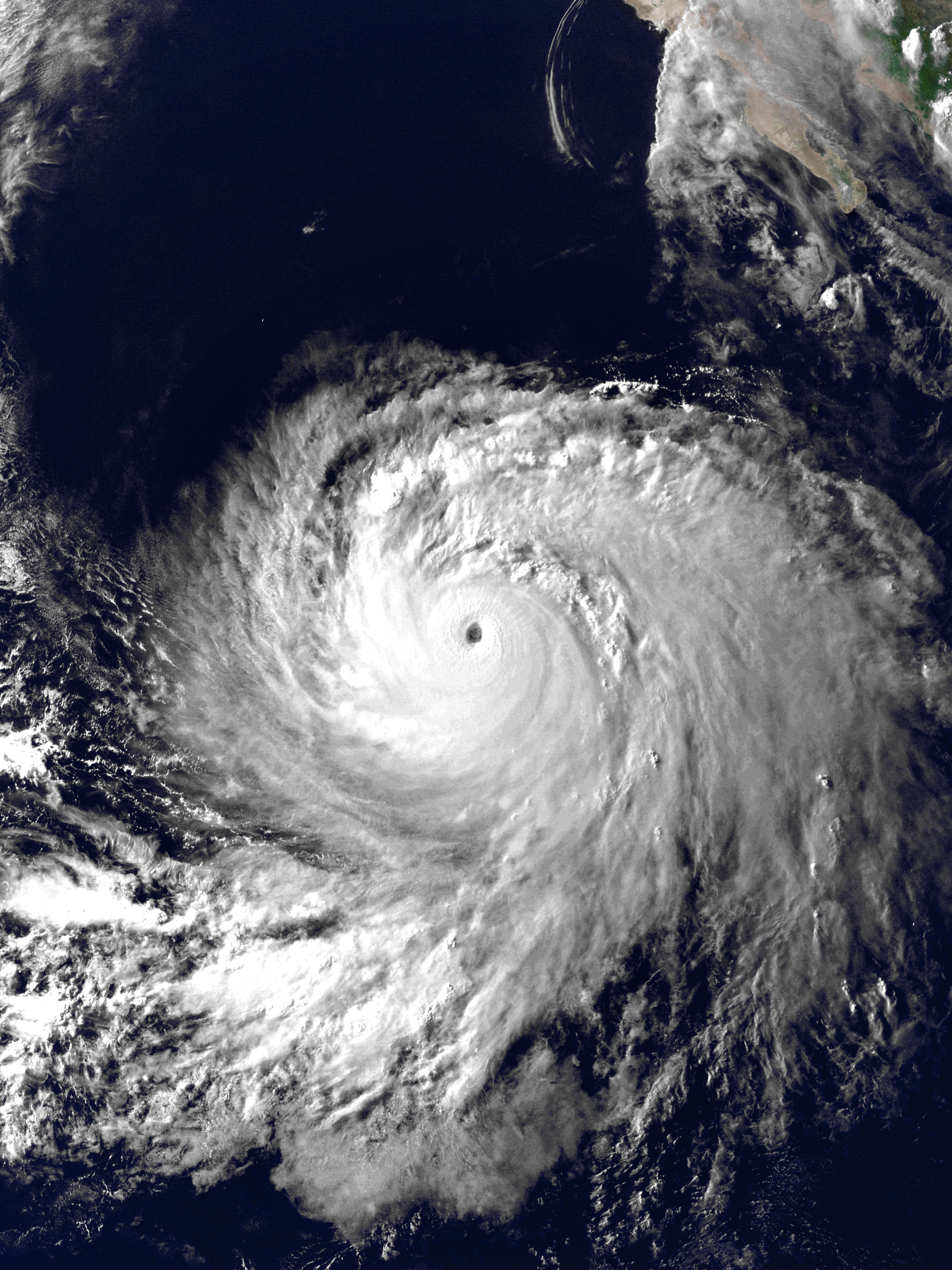
Hurricane Guillermo at peak intensity early on August 5

- 00:00 UTC (5:00 p.m. PDT, August 4) at 14.3°N 118.0°W – Hurricane Guillermo attains its peak intensity, with maximum sustained winds of 160 mph (260 km/h) and a minimum central pressure of 919 mbar (27.14 inHg), about 795 mi (1,280 km) southwest of the southern tip of the Baja California peninsula.
- 18:00 UTC (11:00 a.m. PDT) at 14.6°N 122.4°W – Hurricane Guillermo weakens to Category 4 intensity about 995 mi (1,600 km) southwest of the southern tip of the Baja California peninsula.

August 6

- 18:00 UTC (11:00 a.m. PDT) at 15.9°N 128.2°W – Hurricane Guillermo weakens to Category 3 intensity about 1,285 mi (2,065 km) west-southwest of the southern tip of the Baja California peninsula.

August 7

- 06:00 UTC (11:00 p.m. PDT, August 6) at 16.5°N 130.9°W – Hurricane Guillermo weakens to Category 2 intensity about 1,425 mi (2,295 km) west-southwest of the southern tip of the Baja California peninsula.
- 12:00 UTC (5:00 a.m. PDT) at 16.9°N 132.0°W – Hurricane Guillermo weakens to Category 1 intensity about 1,490 mi (2,400 km) west-southwest of the southern tip of the Baja California peninsula.

August 8

- 06:00 UTC (11:00 p.m. PDT, August 7) at 18.3°N 135.1°W – Hurricane Guillermo weakens into a tropical storm about 1,265 mi (2,035 km) east of Hawaii.

August 10

- 00:00 UTC (2:00 p.m. HST, August 9) at 22.6°N 140.4°W – Tropical Storm Guillermo crosses 140°W, leaving the NHC's jurisdiction and entering the CPHC's area of responsibility.
- 00:00 UTC (5:00 p.m. PDT, August 9) at 10.5°N 114.4°W – Tropical Depression Ten-E forms from a tropical wave about 905 mi (1,455 km) south-southwest of the southern tip of the Baja California peninsula.
- 18:00 UTC (8:00 a.m. HST) at 25.0°N 142.2°W – Tropical Storm Guillermo weakens into a tropical depression about 900 mi (1,445 km) east-northeast of Hilo, Hawaii.

August 11

- 18:00 UTC (8:00 a.m. HST) at 28.4°N 144.4°W – Tropical Depression Guillermo restrengthens into a tropical storm about 905 mi (1,455 km) northeast of Hilo.
- 18:00 UTC (11:00 a.m. PDT) at 12.9°N 116.8°W – Tropical Depression Ten-E strengthens into Tropical Storm Hilda about 825 mi (1,325 km) southwest of the southern tip of the Baja California peninsula.

August 12

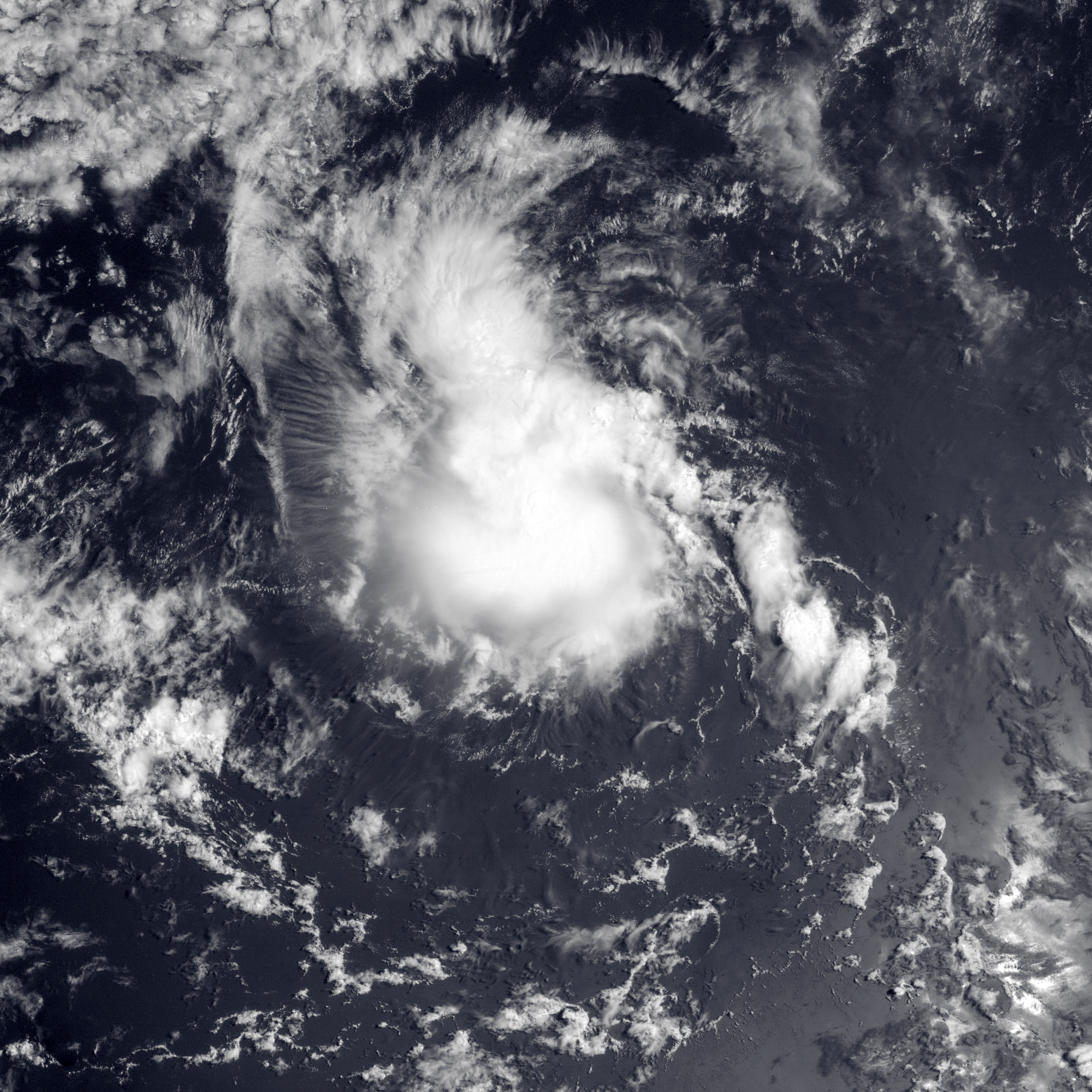
Tropical Storm Hilda at peak intensity late on August 12

- 12:00 UTC (5:00 a.m. PDT) at 13.1°N 119.3°W – Tropical Storm Hilda attains its peak intensity, with maximum sustained winds of 50 mph (85 km/h) and a minimum central pressure of 1000 mbar (29.53 inHg), about 910 mi (1,465 km) southwest of the southern tip of the Baja California peninsula.

August 14

- 06:00 UTC (11:00 p.m. PDT, August 13) at 15.6°N 126.2°W – Tropical Storm Hilda weakens into a tropical depression about 1,170 mi (1,880 km) west-southwest of the southern tip of the Baja California peninsula.

August 15

- 00:00 UTC (5:00 p.m. PDT, August 14) at 17.2°N 130.2°W – Tropical Depression Hilda is last noted as a tropical cyclone about 1,370 mi (2,205 km) west-southwest of the southern tip of the Baja California peninsula, dissipating shortly thereafter.
- 12:00 UTC (2:00 a.m. HST) at 39.3°N 159.7°W – Tropical Storm Guillermo weakens into a tropical depression about 1,250 mi (2,010 km) north of Honolulu.

August 16

- 00:00 UTC (2:00 p.m. HST, August 15) at 41.8°N 161.0°W – Tropical Depression Guillermo transitions into an extratropical cyclone about 1,425 mi (2,295 km) north of Honolulu, and later dissipates off the coast of the Pacific Northwest.

August 17

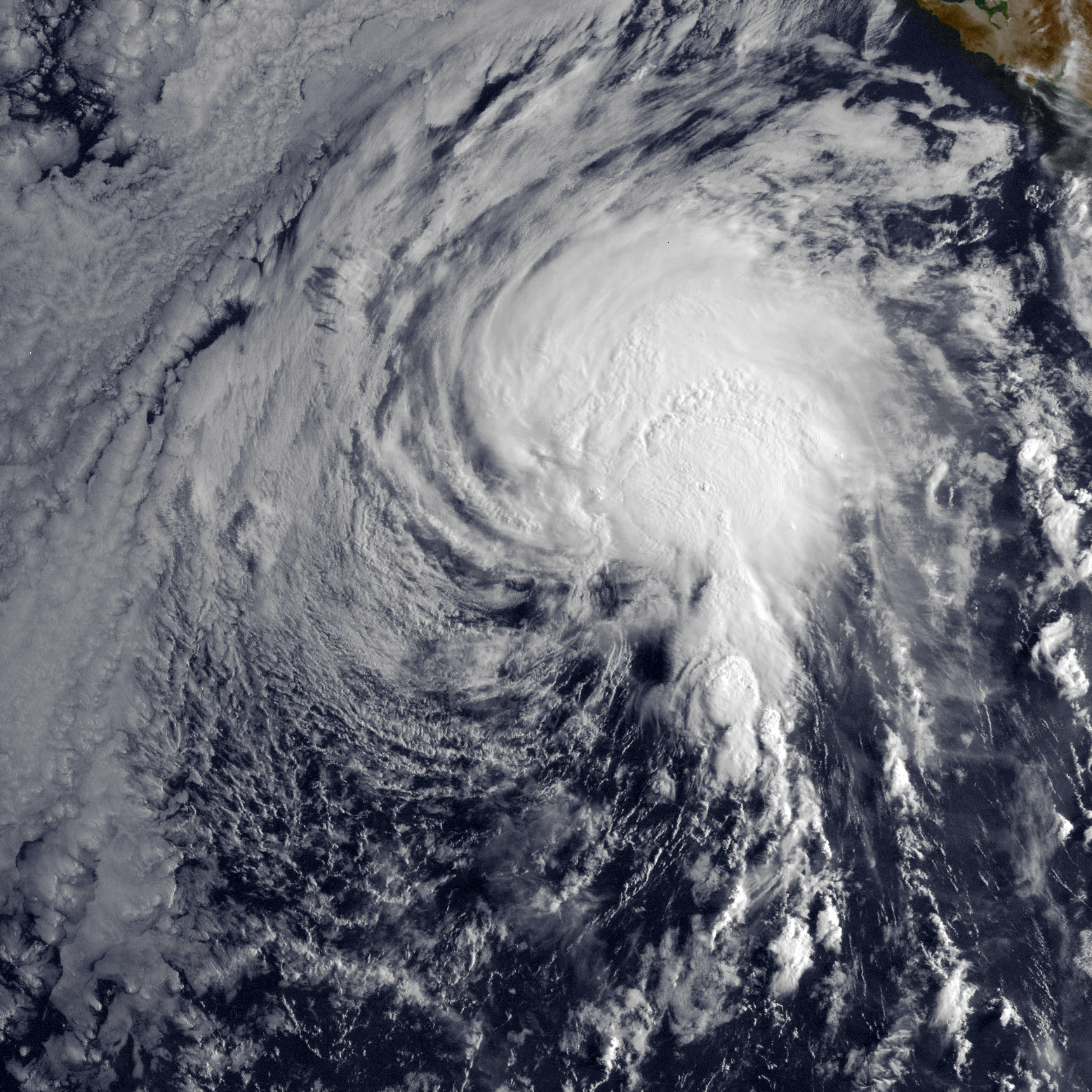
Tropical Storm Ignacio at peak intensity on August 17

- 00:00 UTC (5:00 p.m. PDT, August 16) at 18.7°N 117.9°W – A tropical depression forms from a large area of unsettled weather about 585 mi (945 km) west-southwest of the southern tip of the Baja California peninsula.
- 12:00 UTC (5:00 a.m. PDT) at 20.4°N 119.4°W – The recently formed tropical depression strengthens into Tropical Storm Ignacio about 625 mi (1,010 km) west-southwest of the southern tip of the Baja California peninsula. It simultaneously attains its peak intensity, with maximum sustained winds of 40 mph (65 km/h) and a minimum central pressure of 1005 mbar (29.68 inHg).

August 18

- 06:00 UTC (11:00 p.m. PDT, August 17) at 23.2°N 121.2°W – Tropical Storm Ignacio weakens into a tropical depression about 715 mi (1,150 km) west of the southern tip of the Baja California peninsula.

August 19

- 12:00 UTC (5:00 a.m. PDT) at 30.0°N 121.8°W – Tropical Depression Ignacio transitions into an extratropical cyclone about 335 mi (535 km) southwest of San Diego, California, and later dissipates off the coast of south-central California.

August 25

- 12:00 UTC (5:00 a.m. PDT) at 10.9°N 133.1°W – A tropical depression forms from a large area of unsettled weather about 1,730 mi (2,785 km) west-southwest of the southern tip of the Baja California peninsula.

August 26

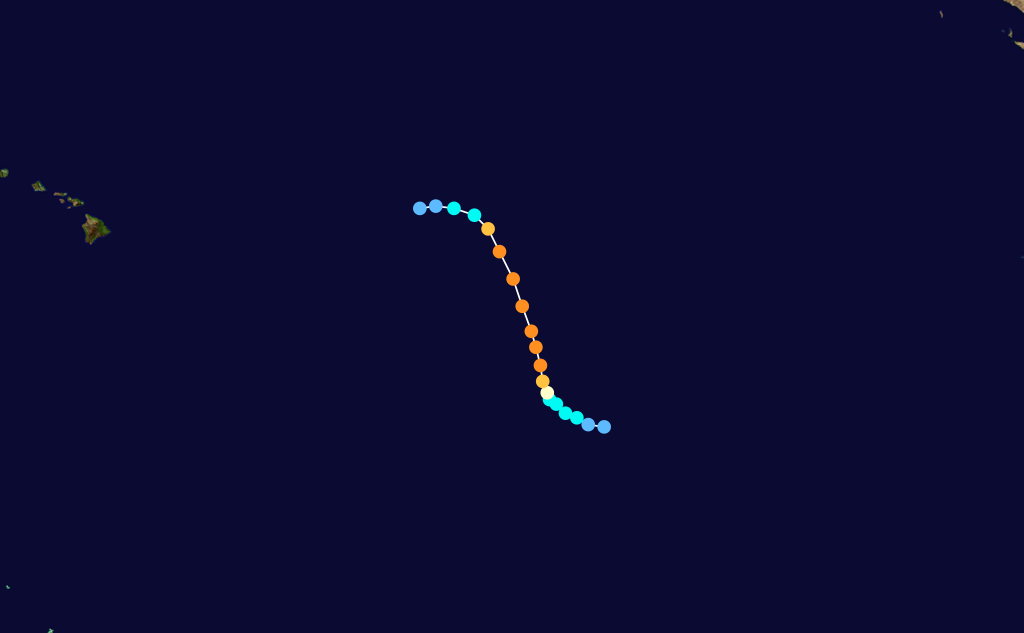
Storm path of Hurricane Jimena

- 00:00 UTC (5:00 p.m. PDT, August 25) at 11.3°N 134.3°W – The recently formed tropical depression strengthens into Tropical Storm Jimena about 1,790 mi (2,880 km) west-southwest of the southern tip of the Baja California.

August 27

- 00:00 UTC (5:00 p.m. PDT, August 26) at 12.4°N 135.6°W – Tropical Storm Jimena strengthens into a Category 1 hurricane about 1,830 mi (2,945 km) west-southwest of the southern tip of the Baja California peninsula.
- 06:00 UTC (11:00 p.m. PDT, August 26) at 12.9°N 135.8°W – Hurricane Jimena rapidly strengthens to Category 3 intensity about 1,830 mi (2,945 km) west-southwest of the southern tip of the Baja California peninsula, making it the fourth major hurricane of the season.
- 12:00 UTC (5:00 a.m. PDT) at 13.6°N 135.9°W – Hurricane Jimena strengthens to Category 4 intensity about 1,810 mi (2,915 km) west-southwest of the southern tip of the Baja California peninsula.

August 28

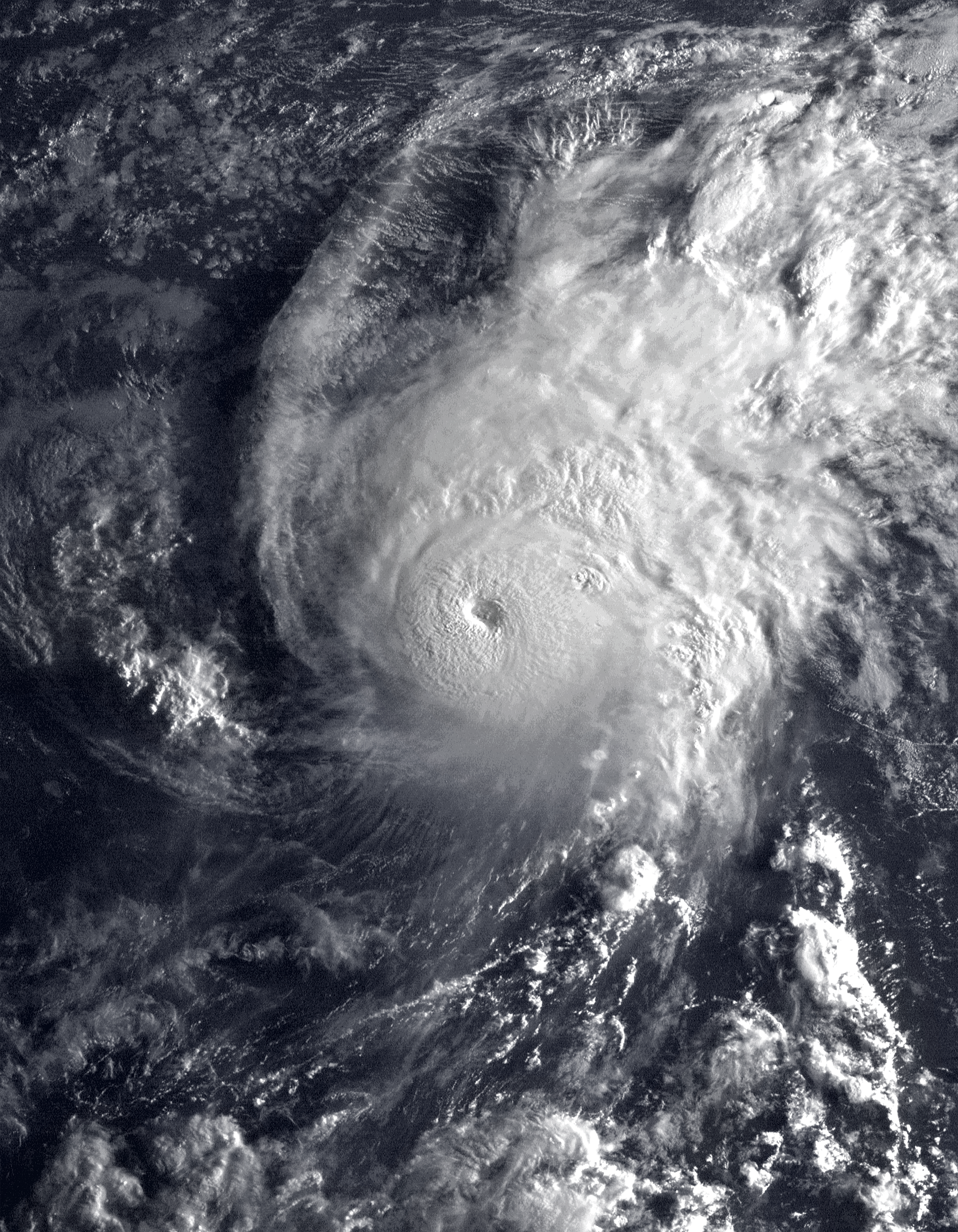
Hurricane Jimena at peak intensity on August 28

- 15:00 UTC (8:00 a.m. PDT) at 18.0°N 137.5°W – Hurricane Jimena attains its peak intensity, with maximum sustained winds of 140 mph (220 km/h) and a minimum central pressure of 942 mbar (27.82 inHg), about 1,810 mi (2,915 km) west of the southern tip of the Baja California peninsula.

August 29

- 00:00 UTC (5:00 p.m. PDT, August 28) at 19.6°N 138.2°W – Hurricane Jimena weakens to Category 3 intensity about 1,830 mi (2,945 km) west of the southern tip of the Baja California peninsula.
- 06:00 UTC (11:00 p.m. PDT, August 28) at 20.2°N 138.8°W – Hurricane Jimena drastically weakens into a tropical storm about 1,860 mi (2,990 km) west of the southern tip of the Baja California peninsula.
- 18:00 UTC (8:00 a.m. HST) at 20.6°N 140.5°W – Tropical Storm Jimena weakens into a tropical depression as it crosses 140°W into the Central Pacific basin, about 930 mi (1,500 km) east of Cape Kumukahi Light.

August 30

- 00:00 UTC (2:00 p.m. HST, August 29) at 20.5°N 141.2°W – Tropical Depression Jimena is last noted as a tropical cyclone about 885 mi (1,425 km) east of Cape Kumukahi Light, dissipating shortly thereafter.

=== September ===
September 2

- 18:00 UTC (8:00 a.m. HST) at 13.5°N 177.7°W (Note: HURDAT places Tropical Depression Two-C—future Tropical Storm Oliwa—at 13.2°N 177.7°W, or about 600 mi (965 km) west-southwest of Johnston Atoll.) – Tropical Depression Two-C forms from a tropical disturbance about 585 mi (945 km) west-southwest of Johnston Atoll. (Note: HURDAT initiates Oliwa at 06:00 UTC on August 28 (8:00 p.m. HST on August 27) near 11.8°N 166.7°W, about 390 mi (630 km) south-southwest of Johnston Atoll.)

September 3

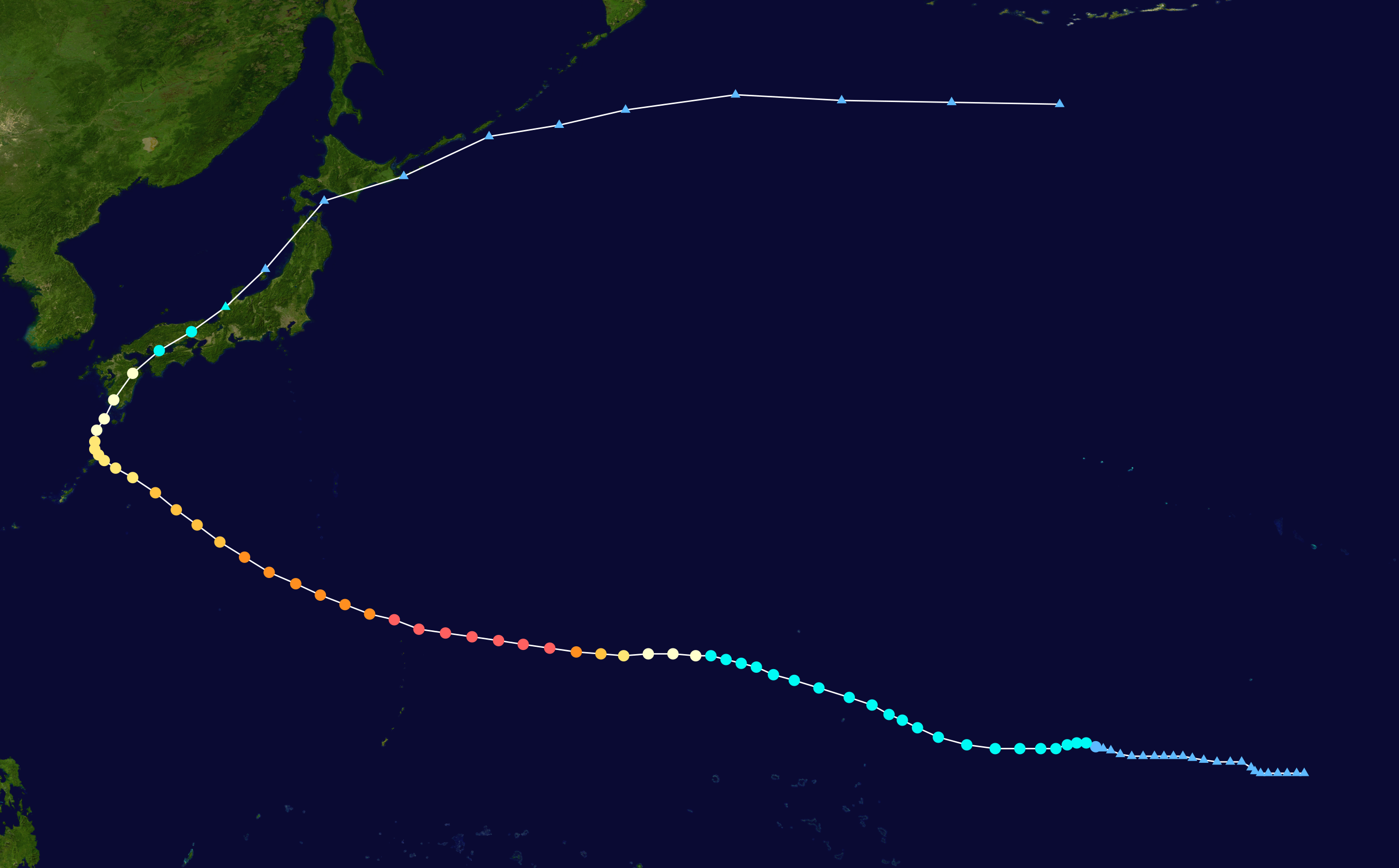
Storm path of Tropical Storm—later Typhoon—Oliwa, including the time it spent west of the International Date Line (IDL)

- 00:00 UTC (2:00 p.m. HST, September 2) at 13.9°N 178.0°W (Note: HURDAT places Oliwa at 13.3°N 178.2°W, or about 625 mi (1,010 km) west-southwest of Johnston Atoll.) – Tropical Depression Two-C strengthens into Tropical Storm Oliwa about 600 mi (965 km) west-southwest of Johnston Atoll.
- 18:00 UTC (8:00 a.m. HST) at 13.5°N 179.3°W (Note: HURDAT places Oliwa at 13.1°N 179.8°W, or about 730 mi (1,175 km) west-southwest of Johnston Atoll.) – Tropical Storm Oliwa attains maximum sustained winds of 50 mph (85 km/h)—its highest while in the Central Pacific basin—accompanied by an unknown central pressure about 690 mi (1,110 km) west-southwest of Johnston Atoll. (Note: According to HURDAT, Oliwa did not strengthen beyond 40 mph (65 km/h) while east of the International Date Line.)
- 18:00 UTC (11:00 a.m. PDT) at 17.7°N 112.2°W – A tropical depression forms from a tropical wave about 385 mi (620 km) south-southwest of the southern tip of the Baja California peninsula.

September 4

- 00:00 UTC (2:00 p.m. HST, September 3) at 13.1°N 179.9°W (Note: HURDAT places Oliwa at 13.1°N 179.4°E, or about 785 mi (1,260 km) west-southwest of Johnston Atoll.) – Tropical Storm Oliwa crosses the IDL into the Western Pacific basin about 735 mi (1,185 km) west-southwest of Johnston Atoll, becoming a part of the annual typhoon season and later strengthening into a powerful typhoon.
- 06:00 UTC (11:00 p.m. PDT, September 3) at 18.7°N 114.4°W – The recently formed tropical depression strengthens into Tropical Storm Kevin about 410 mi (655 km) southwest of the southern tip of the Baja California peninsula.

September 5

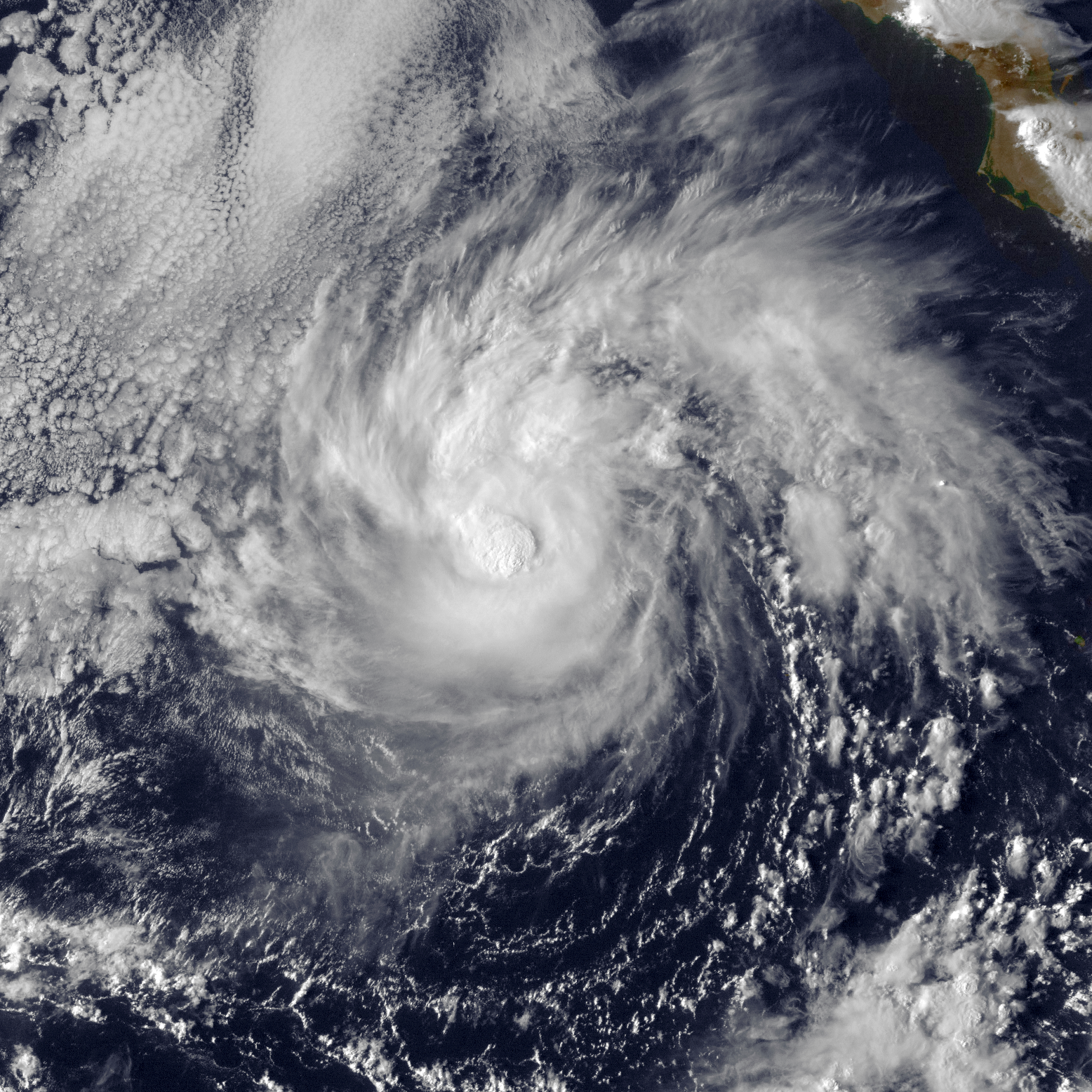
Tropical Storm Kevin near peak intensity early on September 5

- 06:00 UTC (11:00 p.m. PDT, September 4) at 20.4°N 118.9°W – Tropical Storm Kevin attains its peak intensity, with maximum sustained winds of 60 mph (95 km/h) and a minimum central pressure of 994 mbar (29.35 inHg), about 600 mi (965 km) west-southwest of the southern tip of the Baja California peninsula.

September 6

- 06:00 UTC (11:00 p.m. PDT, September 5) at 20.4°N 123.4°W – Tropical Storm Kevin weakens into a tropical depression about 880 mi (1,415 km) west of the southern tip of the Baja California peninsula.

September 7

- 00:00 UTC (5:00 p.m. PDT, September 6) at 21.2°N 126.8°W – Tropical Depression Kevin is last noted as a tropical cyclone about 1,080 mi (1,740 km) west of the southern tip of the Baja California peninsula, dissipating shortly thereafter.

September 9

- 12:00 UTC (5:00 a.m. PDT) at 12.4°N 104.7°W – A tropical depression forms from a tropical wave about 460 mi (740 km) south of Manzanillo.

September 10

- 00:00 UTC (5:00 p.m. PDT, September 9) at 13.5°N 106.1°W – The recently formed tropical depression strengthens into Tropical Storm Linda about 405 mi (650 km) south-southwest of Manzanillo.

September 11

- 00:00 UTC (5:00 p.m. PDT, September 10) at 15.4°N 107.4°W – Tropical Storm Linda strengthens into a Category 1 hurricane about 320 mi (520 km) southwest of Manzanillo.
- 12:00 UTC (5:00 a.m. PDT) at 15.9°N 108.2°W – Hurricane Linda rapidly strengthens to Category 3 intensity about 335 mi (535 km) southwest of Manzanillo, or about 270 mi (435 km) southeast of Socorro Island, making it the fifth major hurricane of the season.
- 18:00 UTC (11:00 a.m. PDT) at 16.1°N 108.6°W – Hurricane Linda strengthens to Category 4 intensity about 240 mi (390 km) southeast of Socorro Island.

September 12

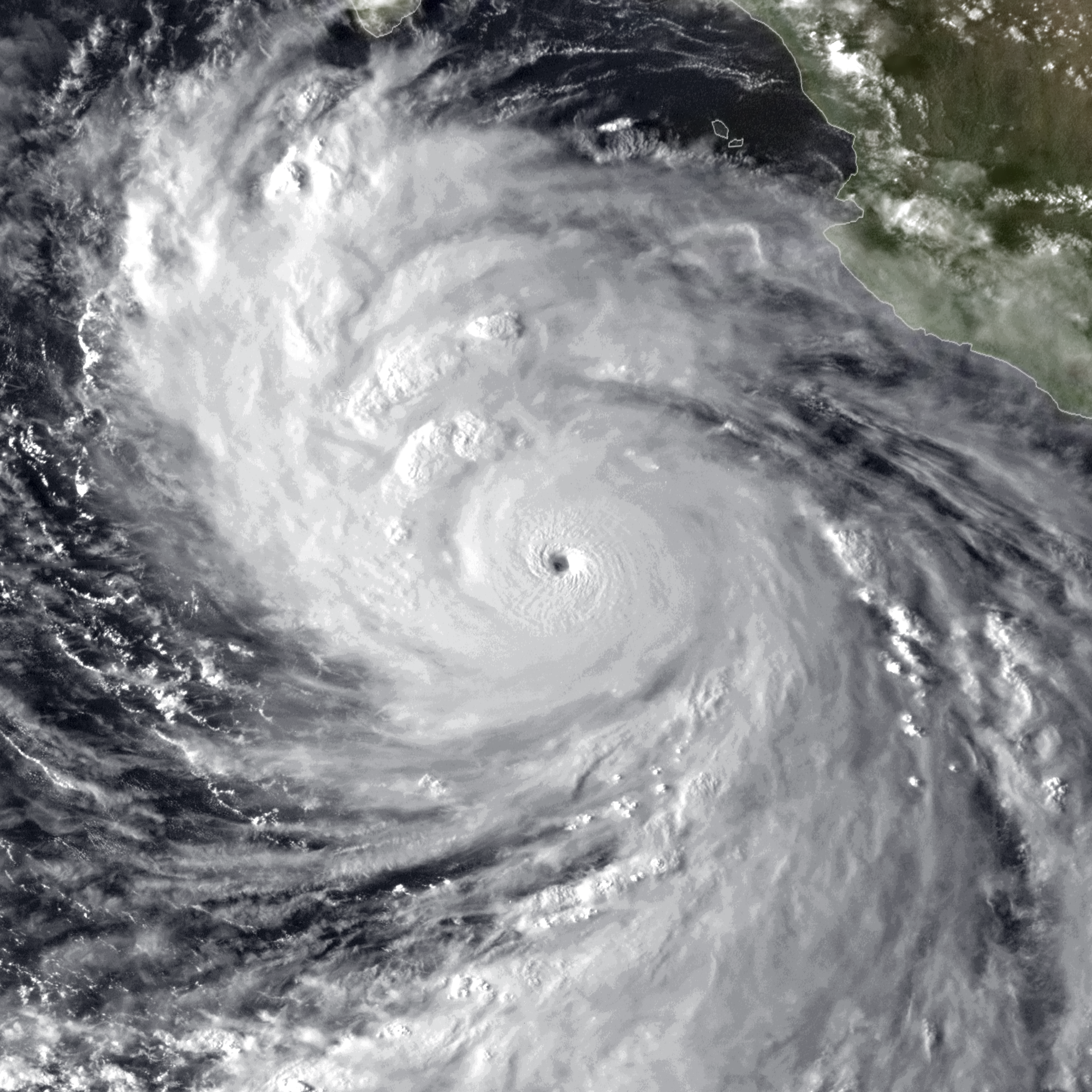
Hurricane Linda early on September 12, shortly before its then-record peak intensity

- 00:00 UTC (5:00 p.m. PDT, September 11) at 16.6°N 109.1°W – Hurricane Linda strengthens to Category 5 intensity about 195 mi (315 km) southeast of Socorro Island, making it the second and final such storm this season.
- 06:00 UTC (11:00 p.m. PDT, September 11) at 17.1°N 109.6°W – Hurricane Linda attains its peak intensity, with maximum sustained winds of 185 mph (295 km/h) and a minimum central pressure of 902 mbar (26.64 inHg), about 150 mi (240 km) southeast of Socorro Island. This makes it not only the strongest storm of the season, but also the strongest Pacific hurricane on record at the time. (Note: Hurricane Linda was surpassed as the strongest recorded Pacific hurricane in 2015 by Hurricane Patricia, which attained peak winds of 215 mph (345 km/h) and a minimum central pressure of 872 mbar (25.75 inHg).)
- 18:00 UTC (11:00 a.m. PDT) at 14.3°N 133.1°W – Tropical Depression Fifteen-E from an area of disturbed weather about 1,480 mi (2,380 km) east-southeast of Cape Kumukahi Light.

September 13

- 18:00 UTC (11:00 a.m. PDT) at 20.6°N 115.3°W – Hurricane Linda weakens to Category 4 intensity about 305 mi (490 km) west-northwest of Socorro Island.

September 14

- 00:00 UTC (5:00 p.m. PDT, September 13) at 13.9°N 135.5°W – Tropical Depression Fifteen-E strengthens into Tropical Storm Marty about 1,335 mi (2,150 km) east-southeast of Cape Kumukahi Light.
- 06:00 UTC (11:00 p.m. PDT, September 13) at 21.3°N 117.8°W – Hurricane Linda weakens to Category 3 intensity about 480 mi (770 km) west-northwest of Socorro Island.
- 12:00 UTC (5:00 a.m. PDT) at 21.6°N 119.0°W – Hurricane Linda weakens to Category 2 intensity about 550 mi (890 km) west-northwest of Socorro Island.
- 12:00 UTC (5:00 a.m. PDT) at 13.3°N 135.8°W – Tropical Storm Marty attains its peak intensity, with maximum sustained winds of 45 mph (75 km/h) and a minimum central pressure of 1002 mbar (29.59 inHg), about 1,330 mi (2,140 km) east-southeast of Cape Kumukahi Light.
- 18:00 UTC (11:00 a.m. PDT) at 21.9°N 120.1°W – Hurricane Linda weakens to Category 1 intensity about 625 mi (1,010 km) west-northwest of Socorro Island.

September 15

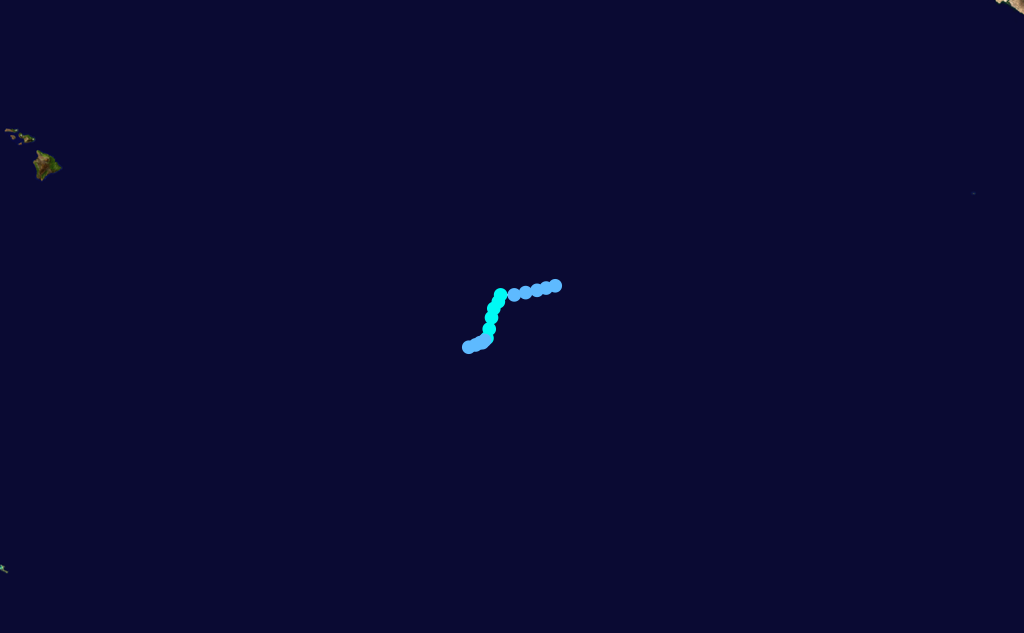
Storm path of Tropical Storm Marty

- 12:00 UTC (5:00 a.m. PDT) at 22.7°N 123.1°W – Hurricane Linda weakens into a tropical storm about 830 mi (1,335 km) west-northwest of Socorro Island, or about 835 mi (1,345 km) west of the southern tip of the Baja California peninsula.
- 12:00 UTC (5:00 a.m. PDT) at 11.9°N 136.2°W – Tropical Storm Marty weakens into a tropical depression about 1,340 mi (2,160 km) east-southeast of Cape Kumukahi Light.

September 16

- 06:00 UTC (11:00 p.m. PDT, September 15) at 12.7°N 101.7°W – A tropical depression forms from a large area of disturbed weather about 310 mi (500 km) south-southwest of Acapulco.
- 12:00 UTC (5:00 a.m. PDT) at 11.6°N 136.9°W – Tropical Depression Marty is last noted as a tropical cyclone about 1,310 mi (2,110 km) east-southeast of Cape Kumukahi Light, dissipating shortly thereafter.
- 18:00 UTC (11:00 a.m. PDT) at 13.6°N 102.1°W – The recently formed tropical depression strengthens into Tropical Storm Nora about 270 mi (435 km) southwest of Acapulco.

September 17

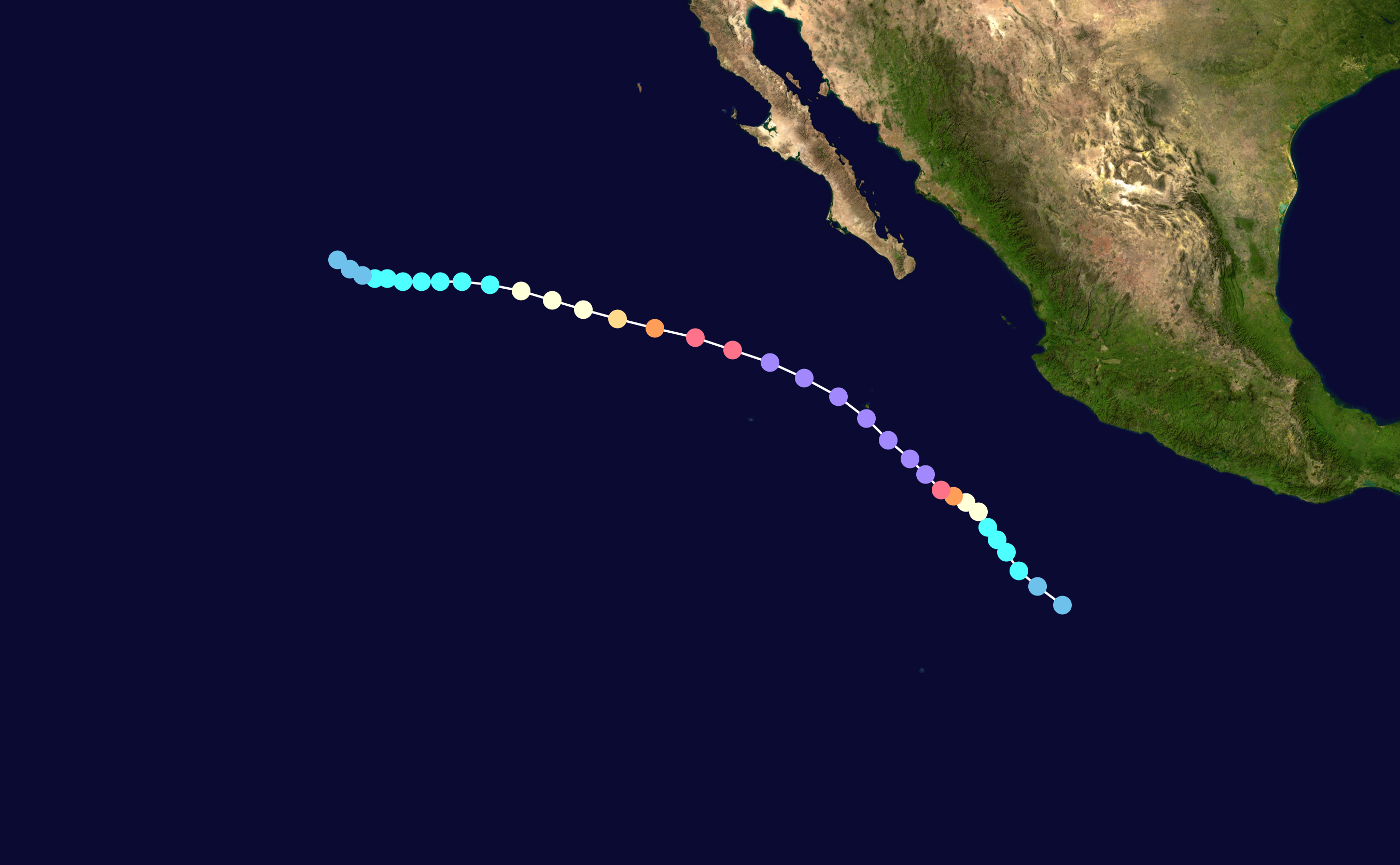
Storm path of Hurricane Linda

- 06:00 UTC (11:00 p.m. PDT, September 16) at 23.0°N 127.2°W – Tropical Storm Linda weakens into a tropical depression about 1,095 mi (1,760 km) west of the southern tip of the Baja California peninsula.
- 18:00 UTC (11:00 a.m. PDT) at 23.5°N 128.0°W – Tropical Depression Linda is last noted as a tropical cyclone about 1,145 mi (1,845 km) west of the southern tip of the Baja California peninsula, dissipating shortly thereafter.

September 18

- 12:00 UTC (5:00 a.m. PDT) at 14.1°N 103.5°W – Tropical Storm Nora strengthens into a Category 1 hurricane about 305 mi (490 km) southwest of Acapulco.
- 18:00 UTC (11:00 a.m. PDT) at 14.1°N 103.7°W – Hurricane Nora strengthens to Category 2 intensity about 315 mi (510 km) southwest of Acapulco.

September 19

- 12:00 UTC (5:00 a.m. PDT) at 14.5°N 104.1°W – Hurricane Nora weakens to Category 1 intensity about 320 mi (520 km) west-southwest of Acapulco.

September 21

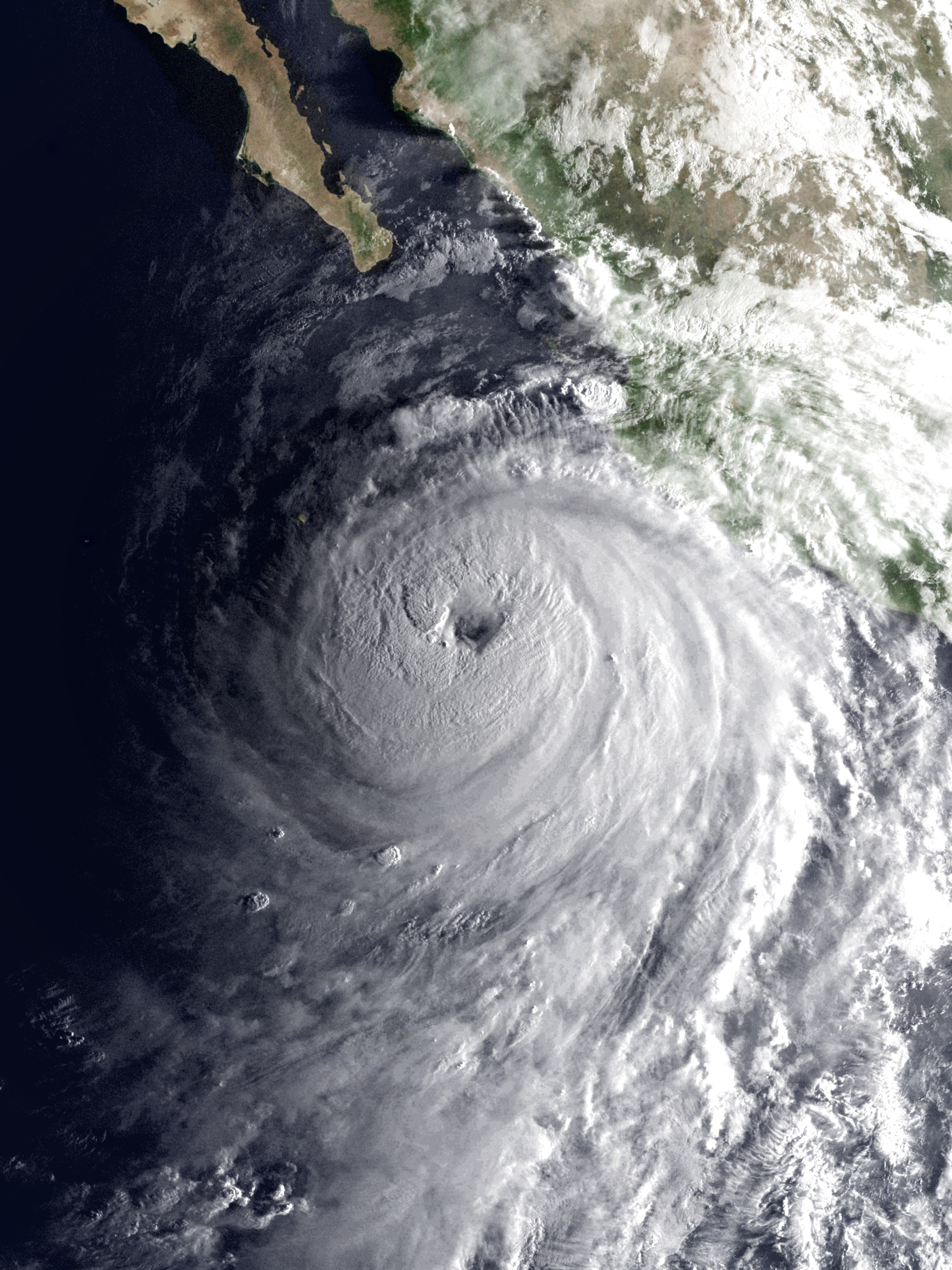
Hurricane Nora at peak intensity on September 21

- 06:00 UTC (11:00 p.m. PDT, September 20) at 16.1°N 107.3°W – Hurricane Nora restrengthens to Category 2 intensity about 495 mi (795 km) west of Acapulco, or about 500 mi (805 km) south-southeast of the southern tip of the Baja California peninsula.
- 12:00 UTC (5:00 a.m. PDT) at 16.6°N 108.0°W – Hurricane Nora rapidly strengthens to Category 4 intensity about 450 mi (720 km) south-southeast of the southern tip of the Baja California, making it the sixth major hurricane of the season. It simultaneously attains its peak intensity, with maximum sustained winds of 130 mph (215 km/h) and a minimum central pressure of 950 mbar (28.05 inHg).
- 18:00 UTC (11:00 a.m. PDT) at 17.2°N 108.9°W – Hurricane Nora weakens to Category 3 intensity about 395 mi (640 km) south of the southern tip of the Baja California peninsula.

September 23

- 00:00 UTC (5:00 p.m. PDT, September 22) at 19.3°N 112.3°W – Hurricane Nora weakens to Category 2 intensity about 290 mi (465 km) south-southwest of the southern tip of the Baja California peninsula.
- 12:00 UTC (5:00 a.m. PDT) at 20.2°N 113.3°W – Hurricane Nora weakens to Category 1 intensity about 280 mi (455 km) southwest of the southern tip of the Baja California peninsula.

September 25

- 06:30 UTC (11:30 p.m. PDT, September 24) at 27.6°N 114.8°W – Hurricane Nora makes its first landfall near Punta Eugenia, Baja California Sur, with maximum sustained winds of 85 mph (140 km/h) and a central pressure of 981 mbar (28.97 inHg), emerging back over the Pacific Ocean shortly thereafter.
- 11:00 UTC (4:00 a.m. PDT) at 29.3°N 114.8°W – Hurricane Nora makes its second and final landfall about 50 mi (85 km) south-southeast of San Fernando, Baja California, with maximum sustained winds of 80 mph (130 km/h) and a central pressure of 983 mbar (29.03 inHg).
- 18:00 UTC (11:00 a.m. PDT) at 31.7°N 114.9°W – Hurricane Nora weakens into a tropical storm over land about 120 mi (195 km) north of San Fernando.

September 26

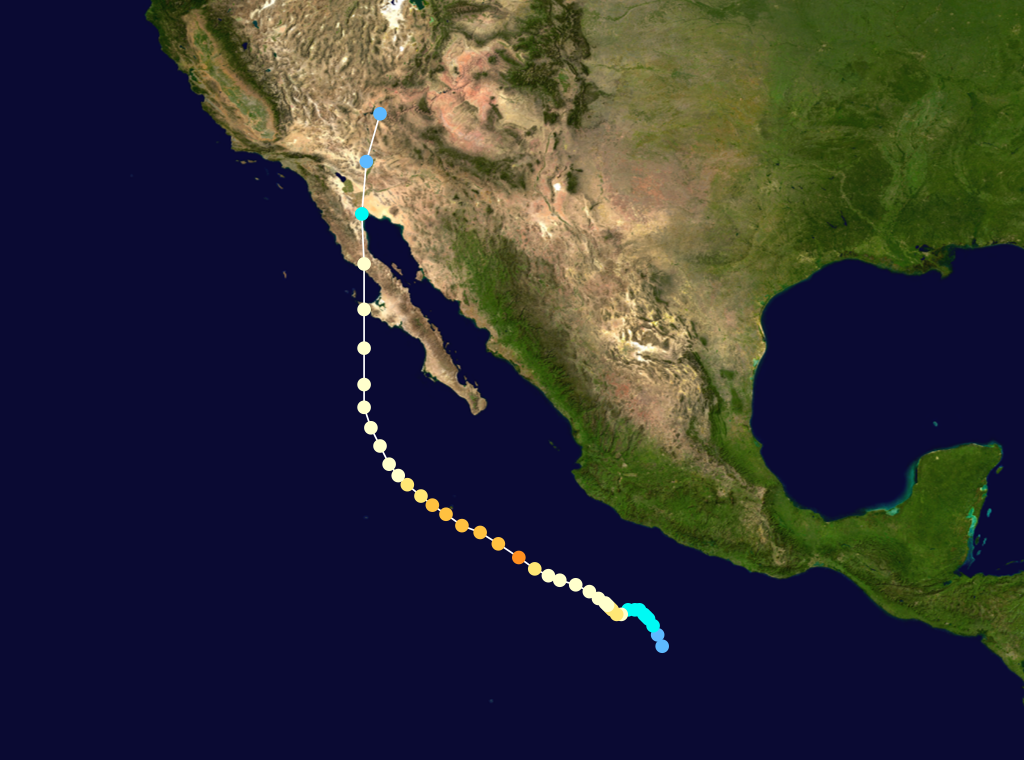
Storm path of Hurricane Nora

- 00:00 UTC (5:00 p.m. PDT, September 25) at 34.0°N 114.7°W – Tropical Storm Nora weakens into a tropical depression over land about 60 mi (95 km) south of Needles, California.
- 06:00 UTC (11:00 p.m. PDT, September 25) at 36.1°N 114.1°W – Tropical Depression Nora is last noted as a tropical cyclone about 90 mi (150 km) north-northeast of Needles, dissipating shortly thereafter.
- 12:00 UTC (5:00 a.m. PDT) at 11.3°N 94.6°W – A tropical depression forms from a tropical wave about 340 mi (545 km) south of Salina Cruz.
- 18:00 UTC (11:00 a.m. PDT) at 12.2°N 94.4°W – The recently formed tropical depression strengthens into Tropical Storm Olaf about 280 mi (455 km) south of Salina Cruz.

September 27

- 18:00 UTC (11:00 a.m. PDT) at 14.5°N 94.8°W – Tropical Storm Olaf attains its peak intensity, with maximum sustained winds of 70 mph (110 km/h) and a minimum central pressure of 989 mbar (29.21 inHg), about 120 mi (195 km) south-southeast of Salina Cruz.

September 29

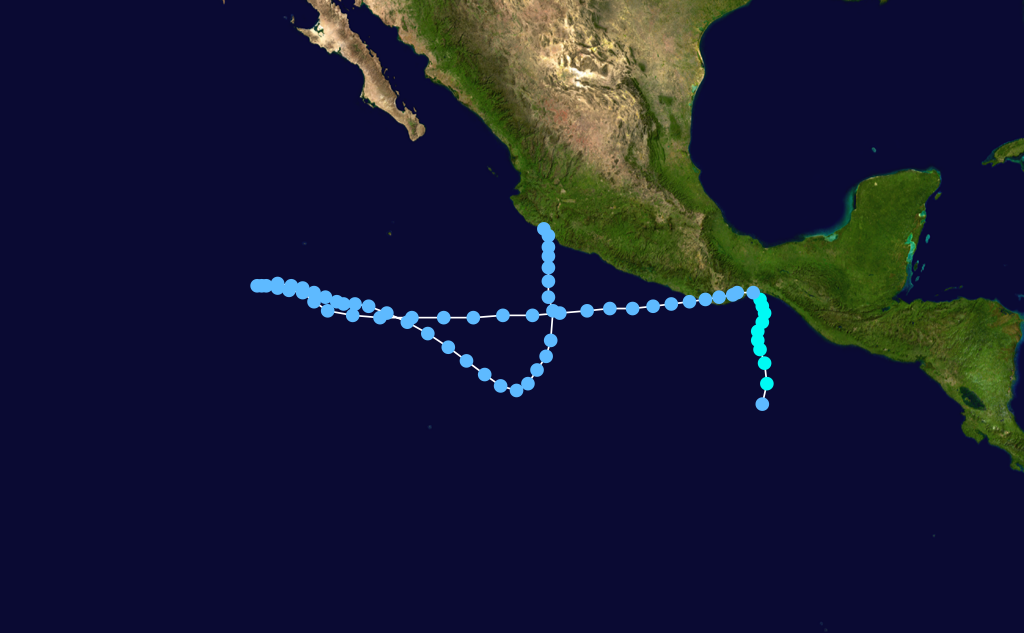
Storm path of Tropical Storm Olaf

- 00:00 UTC (5:00 p.m. PDT, September 28) at 16.2°N 95.0°W – Tropical Storm Olaf weakens into a tropical depression as it makes its first landfall near Salina Cruz with maximum sustained winds of 35 mph (55 km/h) and a central pressure of 1005 mbar (29.68 inHg). It emerges back over the Pacific Ocean about a day later and spends more than a week moving westward off the coast of Mexico, before turning first to the southeast, and then to the north, all with little change in strength.

=== October ===
October 5

- 12:00 UTC (5:00 a.m. PDT) at 12.2°N 96.6°W – A tropical depression forms from a tropical wave about 240 mi (390 km) south of Puerto Ángel, Oaxaca.

October 6

- 06:00 UTC (11:00 p.m. PDT, October 5) at 11.9°N 95.0°W – The recently formed tropical depression strengthens into Tropical Storm Pauline about 275 mi (445 km) south-southeast of Puerto Ángel.
- 12:00 UTC (2:00 a.m. HST) at 15.2°N 143.5°W – Tropical Depression Three-C forms from an area of disturbed weather about 800 mi (1,285 km) east-southeast of Cape Kumukahi Light. (Note: HURDAT initiates Tropical Depression Three-C at 12:00 UTC (2:00 a.m. HST) on October 5 near 14.0°N 139.5°W, or about 1,080 mi (1,740 km) east-southeast of Cape Kumukahi Light.) It is already at its peak intensity, with maximum sustained winds of 30 mph (45 km/h) and an unknown minimum central pressure.

October 7

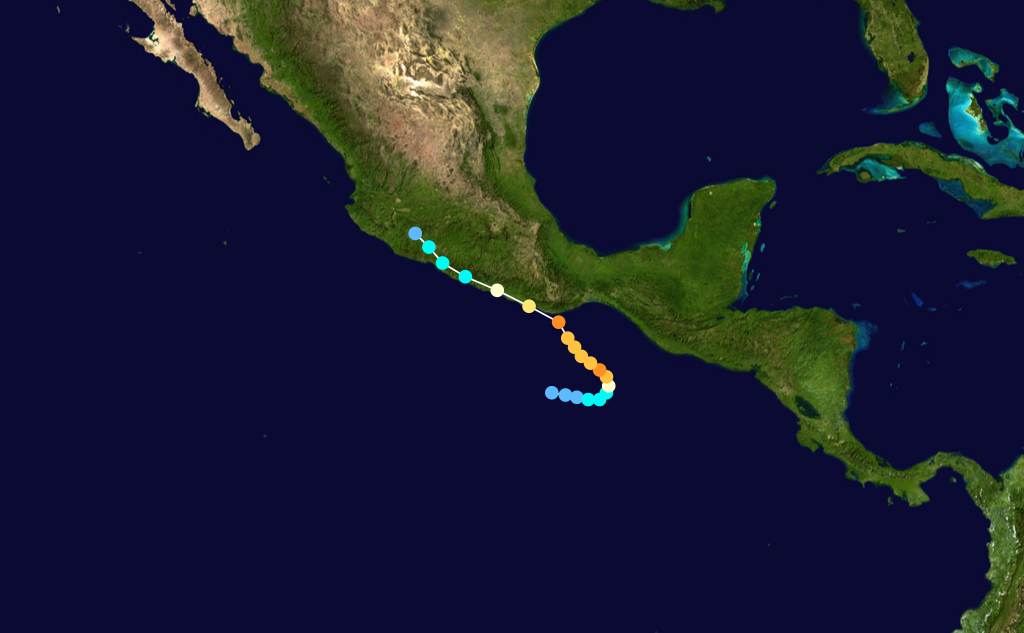
Storm path of Hurricane Pauline

- 00:00 UTC (5:00 p.m. PDT, October 6) at 12.5°N 94.1°W – Tropical Storm Pauline strengthens into a Category 1 hurricane about 270 mi (435 km) southeast of Puerto Ángel.
- 06:00 UTC (11:00 p.m. PDT, October 6) at 12.9°N 94.2°W – Hurricane Pauline rapidly strengthens to Category 3 intensity about 245 mi (400 km) southeast of Puerto Ángel, making it the seventh and final major hurricane of the season.
- 12:00 UTC (5:00 a.m. PDT) at 13.2°N 94.5°W – Hurricane Pauline strengthens to Category 4 intensity about 220 mi (350 km) southeast of Puerto Ángel. It simultaneously attains its peak intensity, with maximum sustained winds of 130 mph (215 km/h) and a minimum central pressure of 948 mbar (27.99 inHg).
- 12:00 UTC (2:00 a.m. HST) at 15.4°N 152.2°W – Tropical Depression Three-C is last noted as a tropical cyclone about 335 mi (535 km) south-southeast of Cape Kumukahi Light, dissipating shortly thereafter. (Note: HURDAT maintains Three-C as a tropical cyclone for another six hours, dissipating it near 15.6°N 154.1°W, or about 275 mi (445 km) south of Cape Kumukahi Light.)
- 18:00 UTC (11:00 a.m. PDT) at 13.5°N 94.9°W – Hurricane Pauline weakens to Category 3 intensity about 185 mi (295 km) southeast of Puerto Ángel.

October 8

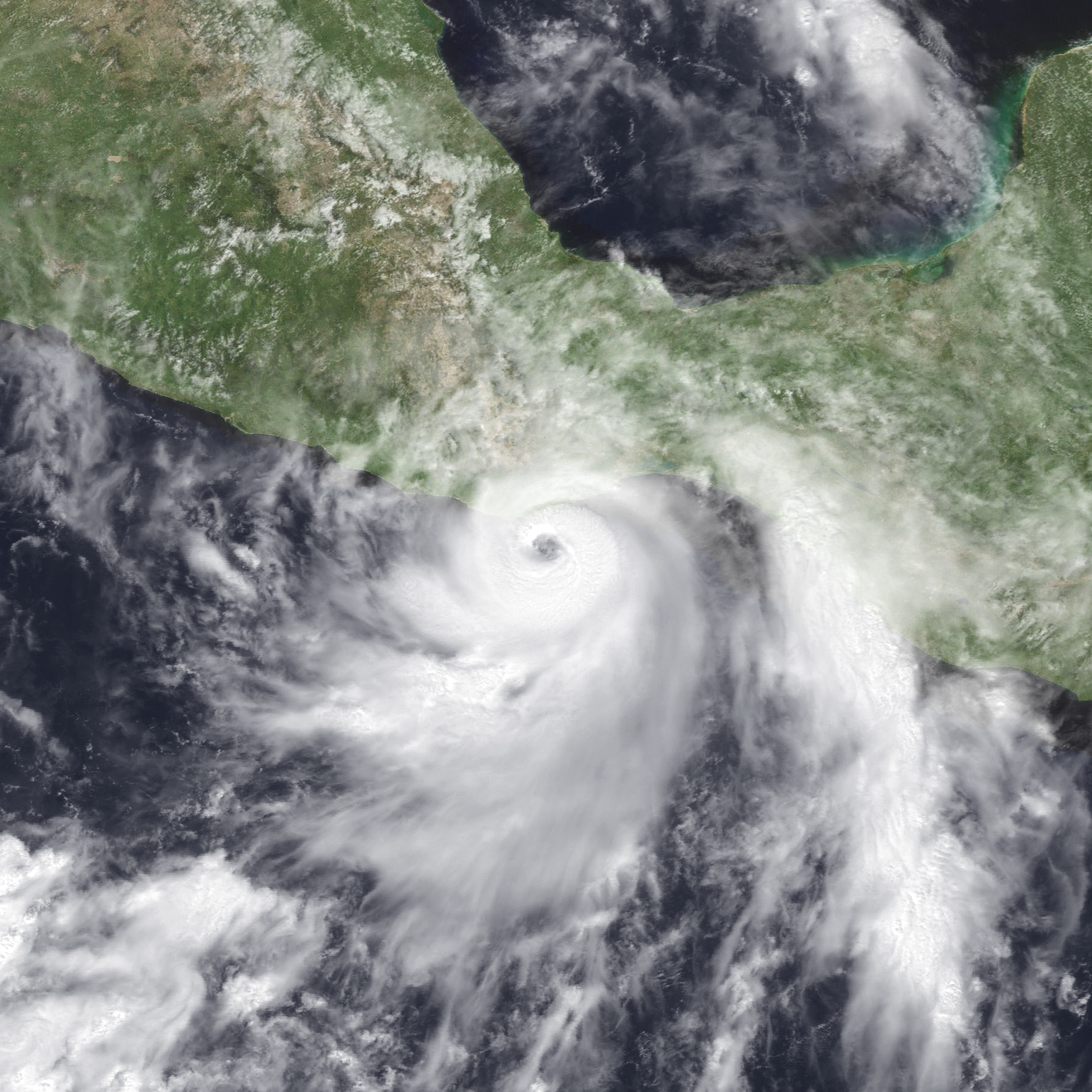
Hurricane Pauline at peak intensity near landfall late on October 8

- 18:00 UTC (11:00 a.m. PDT) at 15.3°N 96.3°W – Hurricane Pauline restrengthens to Category 4 intensity about 30 mi (45 km) south-southeast of Puerto Ángel, and simultaneously reattains its peak intensity.

October 9

- 00:00 UTC (5:00 p.m. PDT, October 8) at 16.0°N 97.6°W – Hurricane Pauline rapidly weakens to Category 2 intensity as it makes landfall about 35 mi (55 km) west-northwest of Puerto Escondido, Oaxaca, with maximum sustained winds of 110 mph (175 km/h) and a central pressure of 960 mbar (28.35 inHg).
- 06:00 UTC (11:00 p.m. PDT, October 8) at 16.7°N 99.0°W – Hurricane Pauline weakens to Category 1 intensity over land about 140 mi (220 km) west-northwest of Puerto Escondido, or about 60 mi (95 km) east of Acapulco.
- 12:00 UTC (5:00 a.m. PDT) at 17.3°N 100.4°W – Hurricane Pauline weakens into a tropical storm over land about 45 mi (75 km) northwest of Acapulco.

October 10

- 06:00 UTC (11:00 p.m. PDT, October 9) at 19.2°N 102.6°W – Tropical Storm Pauline weakens into a tropical depression over land about 240 mi (390 km) northwest of Acapulco, dissipating shortly thereafter.

October 12

- 18:00 UTC (11:00 a.m. PDT) at 19.0°N 104.2°W – After spending nearly two weeks adrift off the Pacific coast of Mexico, Tropical Depression Olaf makes its second and final landfall near Manzanillo with maximum sustained winds of 30 mph (45 km/h) and a central pressure of 1009 mbar (29.80 inHg), dissipating shortly thereafter.

October 31

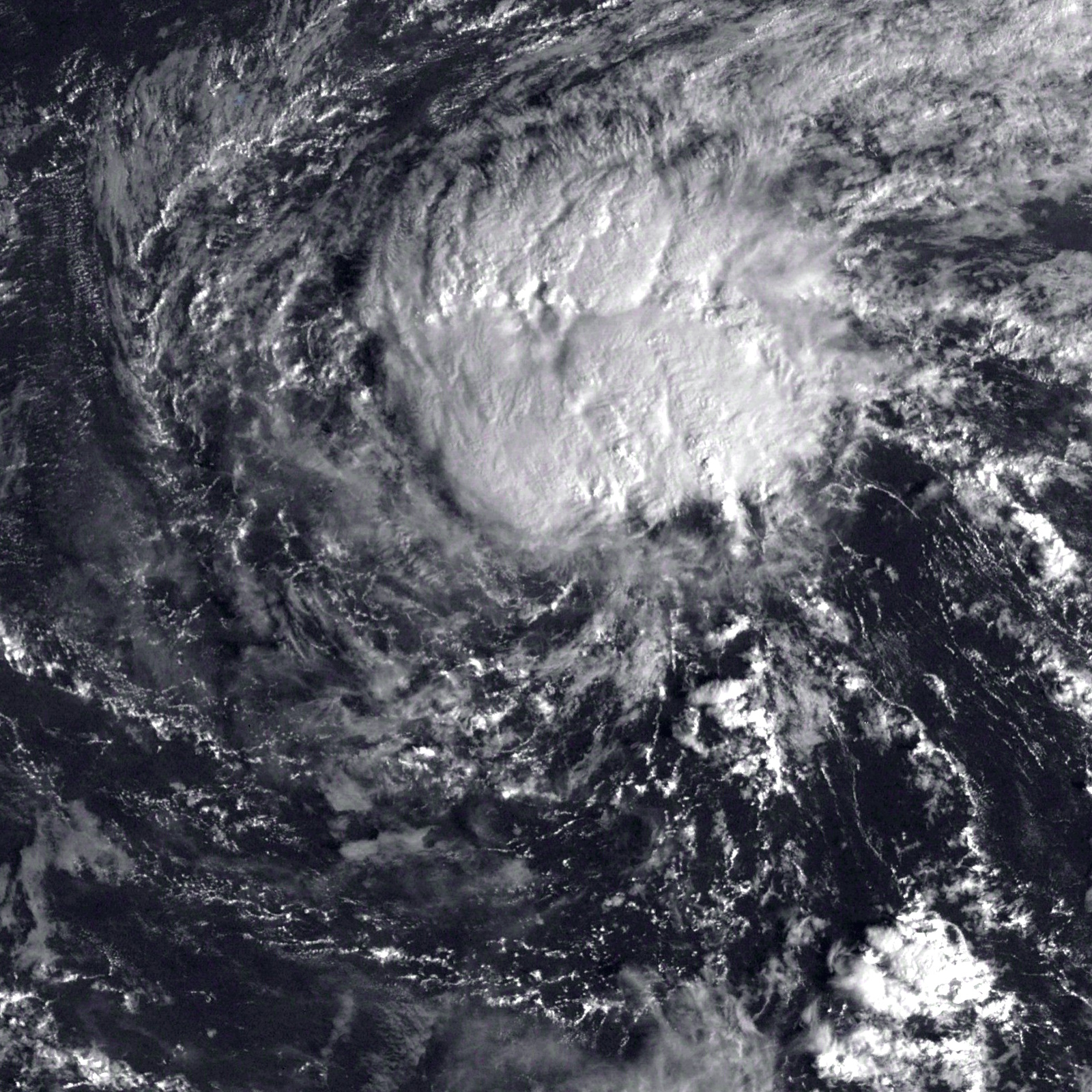
The precursor to Tropical Depression Four-C late on October 30 (Note: HURDAT lists Tropical Depression Four-C as having already become a tropical cyclone at the time of this image.)

- 06:00 UTC (8:00 p.m. HST, October 30) at 12.3°N 167.8°W – Tropical Depression Four-C forms from an area of disturbed weather about 330 mi (530 km) south-southeast of Johnston Atoll. (Note: HURDAT initiates Four-C at 12:00 UTC (2:00 a.m. HST) on October 30 near 11.9°N 165.5°W, or about 430 mi (695 km) southeast of Johnston Atoll.) It is already at its peak intensity, with maximum sustained winds of 35 mph (55 km/h) and an unknown minimum central pressure.

=== November ===
November 1

- 06:00 UTC (8:00 p.m. HST, October 31) at 9.8°N 174.1°W – Tropical Depression Four-C is last noted as a tropical cyclone about 570 mi (915 km) southwest of Johnston Atoll, dissipating shortly thereafter.

November 7

- 00:00 UTC (4:00 p.m. PST, (Note: Daylight saving time ended on October 26, 1997. At 2:00 a.m. PDT, clocks were moved back to 1:00 a.m. PST.) November 6) at 9.0°N 102.5°W – A tropical depression forms from an area of disturbed weather about 570 mi (915 km) south-southwest of Acapulco.

November 8

- 12:00 UTC (4:00 a.m. PST) at 12.7°N 103.5°W – The recently formed tropical depression strengthens into Tropical Storm Rick about 375 mi (600 km) southwest of Acapulco.

November 9

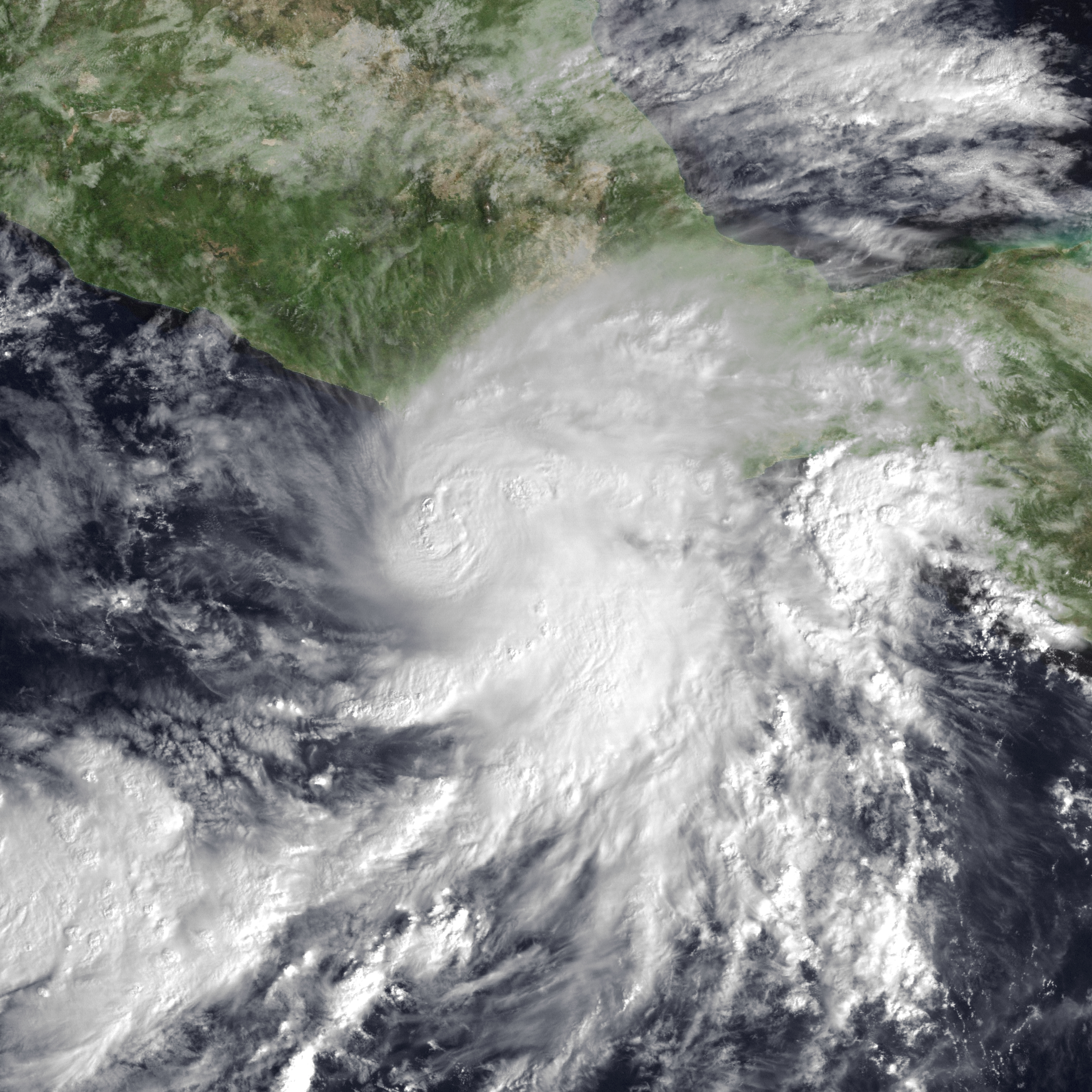
Hurricane Rick approaching Mexico near peak intensity on November 9

- 06:00 UTC (10:00 p.m. PST, November 8) at 14.9°N 100.9°W – Tropical Storm Rick strengthens into a Category 1 hurricane about 150 mi (240 km) south-southwest of Acapulco.
- 12:00 UTC (4:00 a.m. PST) at 15.3°N 99.8°W – Hurricane Rick strengthens to Category 2 intensity about 110 mi (175 km) south of Acapulco. It simultaneously attains its peak intensity, with maximum sustained winds of 100 mph (155 km/h) and a minimum central pressure of 973 mbar (28.73 inHg).
- 18:00 UTC (10:00 a.m. PST) at 15.6°N 98.6°W – Hurricane Rick weakens to Category 1 intensity about 120 mi (195 km) southeast of Acapulco, or about 105 mi (165 km) west of Puerto Escondido.

November 10

- 01:00 UTC (5:00 p.m. PST, November 9) at 15.9°N 97.1°W – Hurricane Rick makes landfall near Puerto Escondido with maximum sustained winds of 85 mph (140 km/h) and a central pressure of 981 mbar (28.97 inHg).
- 12:00 UTC (4:00 a.m. PST) at 16.3°N 94.5°W – Hurricane Rick weakens into a tropical storm over land about 175 mi (280 km) east of Puerto Escondido.
- 18:00 UTC (10:00 a.m. PST) at 17.0°N 93.0°W – Tropical Storm Rick weakens into a tropical depression over land about 280 mi (455 km) east-northeast of Puerto Escondido, dissipating shortly thereafter.

November 30

- The 1997 Pacific hurricane season officially ends.

=== December ===
December 2

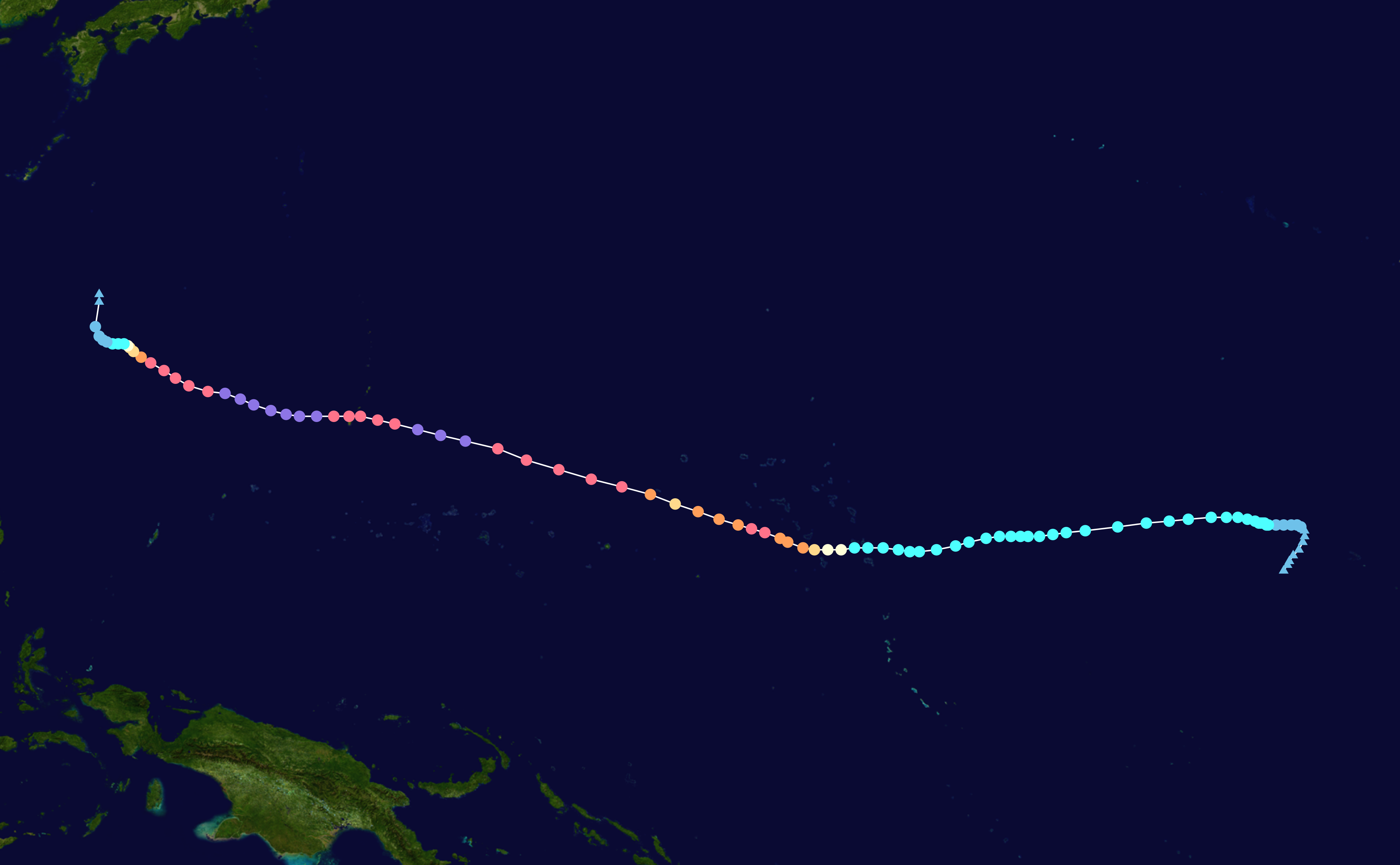
Storm path of Tropical Storm—later Typhoon—Paka, including the time it spent west of the IDL

- 12:00 UTC (2:00 a.m. HST) at 7.3°N 166.6°W – Tropical Depression Five-C forms from an area of disturbed weather about 680 mi (1,095 km) south-southeast of Johnston Atoll. (Note: HURDAT initiates Tropical Depression Five-C—future Tropical Storm Paka—at 18:00 UTC (8:00 a.m. HST) on November 28 near 5.6°N 166.3°W, or about 800 mi (1,285 km) south-southeast of Johnston Atoll. HURDAT also places Five-C slightly father north and west at the CPHC's stated initiation time of 12:00 UTC (2:00 a.m. HST) on December 2, near 8.0°N 166.7°W.)
- 18:00 UTC (8:00 a.m. HST) at 7.5°N 166.9°W (Note: HURDAT places Paka at 8.0°N 167.1°W, or about 625 mi (1,010 km) south-southeast of Johnston Atoll.) – Tropical Depression Five-C strengthens into Tropical Storm Paka about 660 mi (1,065 km) south-southeast of Johnston Atoll.

December 4

- 12:00 UTC (2:00 a.m. HST) at 8.9°N 170.2°W (Note: HURDAT places Paka at 8.4°N 169.3°W, or about 575 mi (925 km) south of Johnston Atoll.) – Tropical Storm Paka attains maximum sustained winds of 65 mph (100 km/h)—its highest while in the Central Pacific basin—accompanied by an unknown central pressure about 540 mi (870 km) south of Johnston Atoll. (Note: According to HURDAT, Paka attained winds of 65 mph (100 km/h) at 12:00 UTC (2:00 a.m. HST) on December 3 near 8.1°N 167.6°W, or about 610 mi (980 km) south of Johnston Atoll.)

December 7

- 00:00 UTC (2:00 p.m. HST, December 6) at 8.4°N 180.0°W (Note: HURDAT places Paka at 7.4°N 179.7°W, or about 945 mi (1,520 km) southwest of Johnston Atoll.) – Tropical Storm Paka crosses the IDL into the Western Pacific basin about 910 mi (1,465 km) southwest of Johnston Atoll, becoming a part of the annual typhoon season and later strengthening into a powerful typhoon.

== See also ==
- Timeline of the 1997 Atlantic hurricane season
- Tropical cyclones in 1997
