= Typhoon Oliwa =

Pacific typhoon in 1997

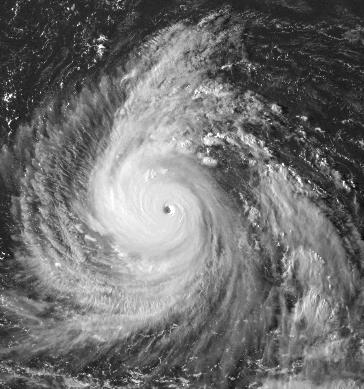
- Typhoon Oliwa on September 10, with a well-defined eye

Meteorological history
- Formed: 2 September 1997
- Extratropical: 17 September 1997
- Dissipated: 19 September 1997

Very strong typhoon
- 10-minute sustained (JMA)
- Highest winds: 185 km/h (115 mph)
- Lowest pressure: 915 hPa (mbar); 27.02 inHg

Category 5-equivalent super typhoon
- 1-minute sustained (SSHWS/JTWC)
- Highest winds: 260 km/h (160 mph)
- Lowest pressure: 898 hPa (mbar); 26.52 inHg

Overall effects
- Fatalities: 12 total
- Missing: 10
- Damage: $50.1 million (1997 USD)
- Areas affected: Northern Mariana Islands, Japan, South Korea
- IBTrACS
- Part of the 1997 Pacific hurricane and typhoon seasons

Typhoon Oliwa was one of a record eleven super typhoons in the 1997 Pacific typhoon season. Oliwa (Hawaiian for Oliver) formed in the central Pacific Ocean on September 2 to the southwest of Hawaii, but it became a typhoon in the western Pacific. Oliwa explosively intensified on September 8, increasing its winds from 85 mph to 160 mph (140 to 260 km/h) in a 24‑hour period. Afterward, it slowly weakened, and after passing east of Okinawa, Oliwa turned northeast and struck Japan with winds of 85 mph (137 km/h). There, it affected 30,000 people and killed 12; thousands of houses were flooded, and some were destroyed. Offshore South Korea, the winds and waves wrecked 28 boats, while one boat went missing with a crew of 10 people. Oliwa dissipated on September 19 in northern Pacific Ocean near the International Date Line.

== Meteorological history ==
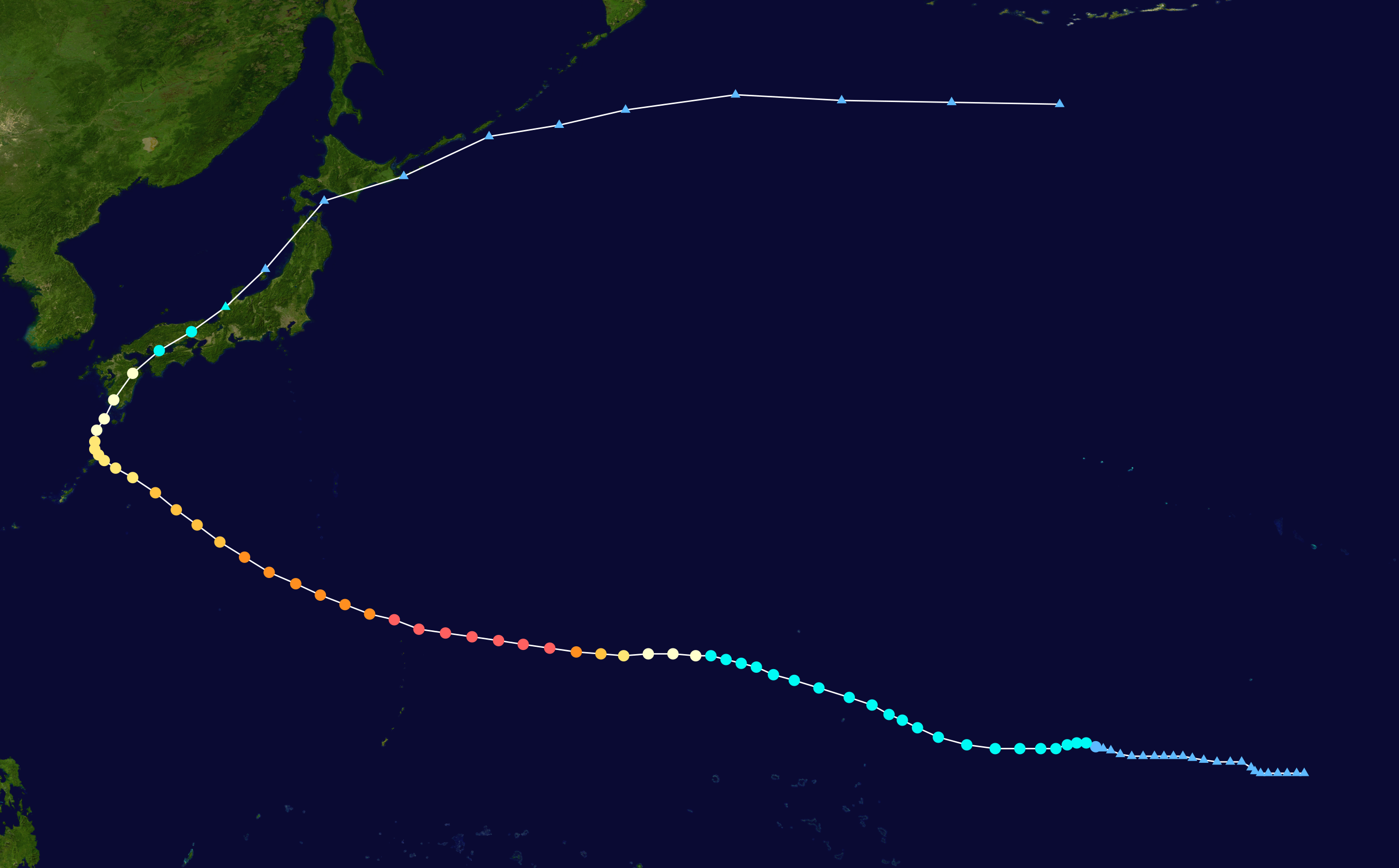
Map plotting the storm's track and intensity, according to the Saffir–Simpson scale Map key Saffir–Simpson scale Tropical depression (≤38 mph, ≤62 km/h) Tropical storm (39–73 mph, 63–118 km/h) Category 1 (74–95 mph, 119–153 km/h) Category 2 (96–110 mph, 154–177 km/h) Category 3 (111–129 mph, 178–208 km/h) Category 4 (130–156 mph, 209–251 km/h) Category 5 (≥157 mph, ≥252 km/h) Unknown Storm type Tropical cyclone Subtropical cyclone Extratropical cyclone, remnant low, tropical disturbance, or monsoon depression

The origins of Typhoon Oliwa were from an unusually eastward extension of the monsoon trough in late August 1997. The tropical disturbance organized southwest of Hawaii, and slowly organized. On September 2, the Central Pacific Hurricane Center (CPHC) initiated advisories on Tropical Depression Two-C about 590 miles (950 km) southwest of Johnston Island, slightly east of the International Date Line. The depression quickly attained tropical storm status, and the CPHC gave it its name. A moderately powerful ridge persisted north of Tropical Storm Oliwa, which caused a slow west to west-northwest track. Water temperatures were slightly warmer than usual, and there was a favourable upper-level environment for the storms strengthening. Initially, however, Oliwa was somewhat disorganized on satellite imagery, and on September 4, as it crossed the International Date Line, there may have been multiple circulations. Upon entering the western Pacific Ocean, the Joint Typhoon Warning Center (JTWC) and the Japan Meteorological Agency (JMA) began issuing advisories on the system (9719). Despite the favorable conditions, further intensification was slow, and it reached typhoon status - winds of at least 75 mph (121 km/h) - on September 8. Prior to that time, Oliwa co-existed with a weak tropical cyclone that formed in a similar location in the south Pacific.

About twelve hours after reaching typhoon status, Oliwa began to undergo unexpected rapid intensification. In a 24‑hour period from 1800 UTC on September 8 to 1800 UTC on September 9, the JTWC assessed the typhoon as nearly doubling in intensity, from 85 to 160 mph (137 to 257 km/h) 1-min winds, while the pressure dropped 69 mbar to a minimum of 898 mbar; based on the estimated intensity, the JTWC classified Oliwa as a super typhoon. The JMA, which is the official agency of the western Pacific, assessed Oliwa as reaching a peak of 115 mph (185 km/h) 10-min winds), with a pressure of 915 mbar. Around that time, satellite imagery indicated a possible eyewall mesovorticy, which is a small scale rotational feature found in the eyewall of an intense tropical cyclone. Additionally, concentric eyewalls developed in the center of Oliwa, which typically occur in strong typhoons. After maintaining peak intensity for 36 hours, Oliwa gradually weakened as it continued to the west-northwest, during which it passed through the Northern Marianas Islands. On September 14, the typhoon slowed to the north of Okinawa, and it turned to the northeast toward Japan. As a weakened typhoon, Oliwa moved ashore on Makurazaki, Kagoshima, Kyushu with winds of 85 mph (137 km/h) late on September 15. It weakened to tropical storm strength while crossing Japan, and deteriorated further to tropical depression status on September 16. On September 17, the JTWC issued the final advisory on Oliwa while it was in the eastern portion of the Sea of Japan. The JMA maintained advisories as the storm crossed northern Japan, and it accelerated over the open Pacific Ocean. On September 19, Oliwa dissipated near the International Date Line to the south of the Aleutian Islands.

== Impact ==
While weakening after peaking in intensity, Oliwa passed about 60 miles (97 km) north of Agrihan in the Northern Marianas Islands. Sustained winds on the island reached 75 mph (121 km/h), with gusts to 85 mph (137 km/h). The winds downed two coconut trees onto a radio antenna, which left the island temporarily without contact to the outside world. On the Japanese island of Kyushu, where Oliwa made landfall as a weakened typhoon, thousands of homes were flooded, and dozens were destroyed. Its slow movement caused heavy rainfall that created a mudslide in Tashiro, Kagoshima, killing three people. Across Kagoshima Prefecture, officials issued evacuations due to flooding, although many did not heed the warnings. In the prefecture, the typhoon destroyed 131 buildings and damaged about 1,700 more. Damage there was estimated at 14 million yen (1997 JPY, $150,000 in 1997 USD). Across Japan, Oliwa caused 12 fatalities and displaced a total of 30,000 people. Total damage amounted to 4.36 billion yen (US$50.1 million). Offshore the South Korea coast, the winds and strong waves wrecked 28 vessels, and 10 people were reported missing from one ship.

== See also ==
- Hurricane Ekeka (1992)
- Typhoon Paka (1997) – another powerful tropical cyclone in the same year which also crossed from the Central Pacific to the Western Pacific
- Hurricane Ioke (2006)
- Hurricane Genevieve (2014) – also crossed the International Date Line as a violent typhoon, but affected no land areas
- Typhoon Halola (2015) – another Central Pacific-Western Pacific crossover storm which had a near-identical track to Oliwa.
