= List of Category 2 Pacific hurricanes =

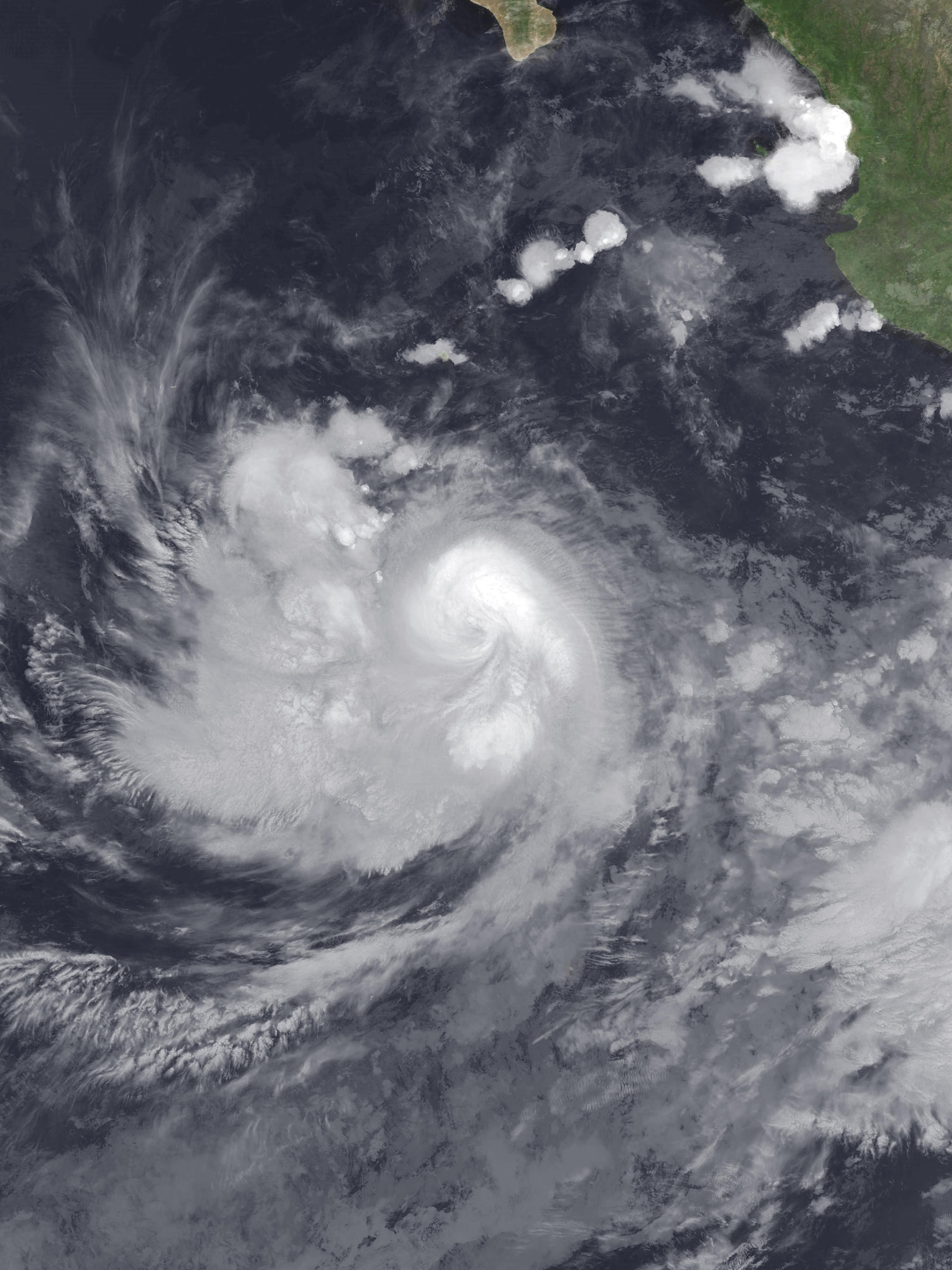
Hurricane Narda at Category 2 strength on September 24, 2025

A Category 2 hurricane is a tropical cyclone which their peak intensity reaches the fourth-highest classification on the Saffir–Simpson hurricane wind scale. They are categorized with 1-minute maximum sustained winds between 83 and 95 knots (96 and 109 mph; 154 and 176 km/h; 43 and 49 m/s). Tropical cyclones that strengthen to Category 2 status and make landfall are capable of causing severe damage to human lives and infrastructure. As of 2022, a total of 89 hurricanes have peaked at Category 2 intensity within the Northeast Pacific basin, which is defined as the region of the Pacific Ocean north of the equator and east of the International Date Line. Collectively, 1,775 people have been killed as a result of Category 2 Pacific hurricanes. Storms that also attained Category 3, 4, or 5 status on the scale are not included.

There is a plethora of factors that influence tropical cyclogenesis, the formation of tropical cyclones, in the Northeastern Pacific. The North Pacific High and Aleutian Low, which occur from December to April, produce strong upper-level winds which prevents the formation of tropical cyclones. During the summer and early autumn months, sea surface temperatures are generally warm enough to support tropical cyclone development in the Northeast Pacific, and perhaps even rapid intensification. Additionally, El Niño events cause more powerful hurricanes to form by generating weaker wind shear and higher sea surface temperatures, while La Niña events reduce the number of such hurricanes by doing the opposite.

== Background ==
A Category 2 hurricane is defined by the National Hurricane Center as a tropical cyclone with winds of at least 83 knots (96 mph; 154 km/h; 43 m/s), but not greater than 95 knots (109 mph; 176 km/h; 49 m/s) on the Saffir-Simpson Scale, which was developed in 1971. Sustained winds are defined by the National Hurricane Center as the average wind speed over the course of one minute at a height of 10 metres (33 ft). Category 2 hurricanes that make landfall have the potential to cause extensive damage. There is also a substantial risk of injury or death to humans and animals due to flying debris.

The Northeast Pacific tropical cyclone basin is the area of the Pacific Ocean north of the equator and east of the International Date Line. The basin is further divided into the east and central Pacific sub-basins. The east Pacific is located between the western coast of North America and the 140th meridian west. The east Pacific is monitored by the National Hurricane Center, the current Regional Specialized Meteorological Center (RSMC) for that area. The central Pacific is located between the 140th meridian west and the International Date Line. It currently has the Central Pacific Hurricane Center as its RSMC. Tropical cyclones occur less frequently in the central Pacific than in the east Pacific, with some years featuring no systems forming or crossing into the basin. Since 1949, all tropical cyclones that have been recorded by RSMCs, both past and present, are listed in the Northeast and North Central Pacific hurricane database (HURDAT), which is produced and supported by the National Hurricane Center.

Tropical cyclones occurring within the Northeast Pacific before 1970 were classified into three categories: tropical depression, tropical storm, and hurricane; these were assigned intensities of 30 mph (48 km/h), 50 mph (80 km/h), and 85 mph (137 km/h) respectively. The only deviations from these procedures occurred when humans were able to take pressure and/or wind measurements. Due lack of specific wind and pressure records, there have been only two confirmed Category 2 hurricanes prior to 1970.

== Climatology ==
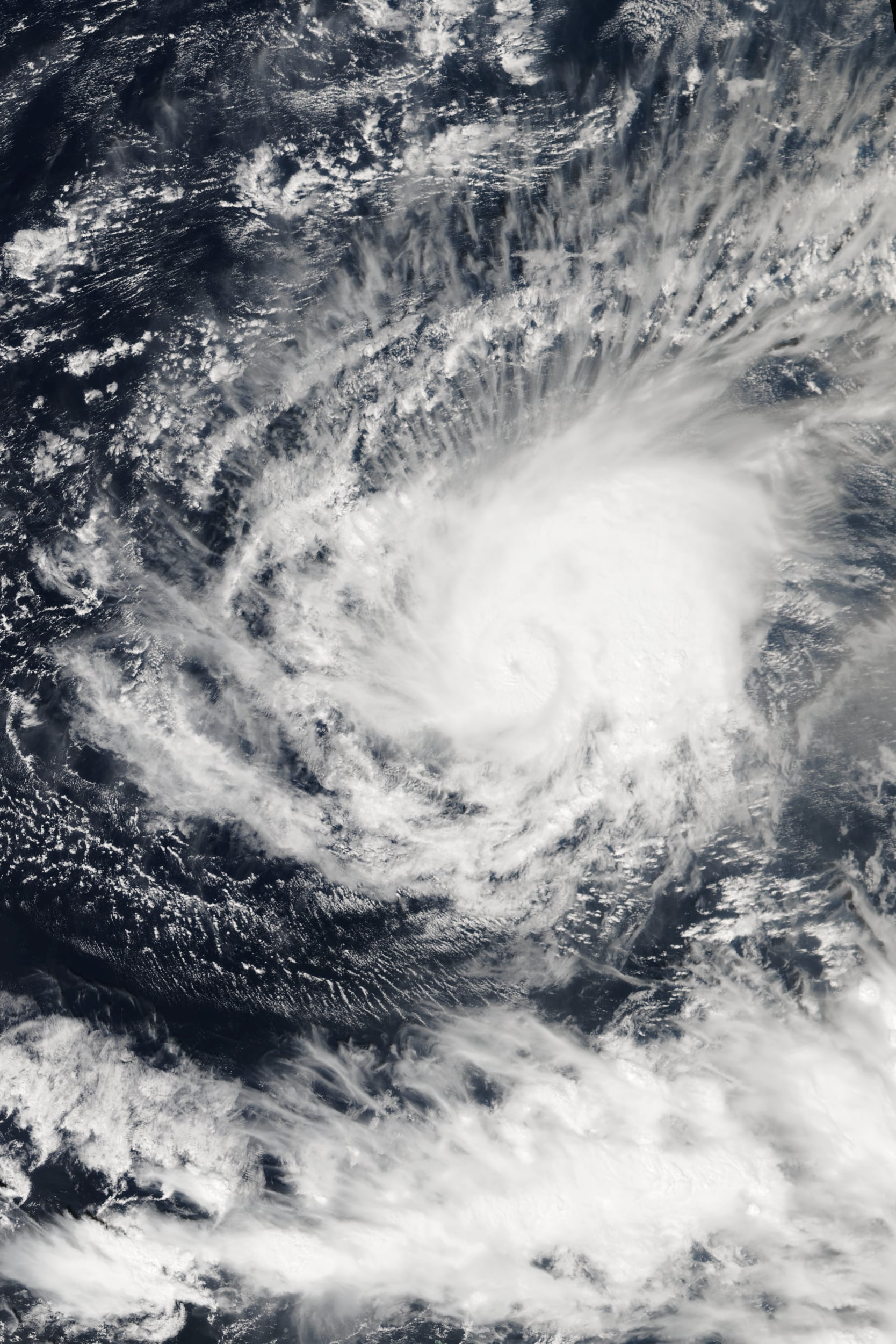
Hurricane Pali near peak intensity on January 13, 2016. Pali is the only Category 2 hurricane to develop outside of the defined boundaries of the Pacific hurricane season. It is also the earliest tropical cyclone on record to develop in the basin.

In the east Pacific and central Pacific sub-basins, hurricane season begins on May 15 and June 1, respectively, with both concluding on November 30. Since 1949, a total of 84 Category 2 hurricanes have developed in the Northeast Pacific basin. Only one has occurred in the off-season: Hurricane Pali of 2016, which developed on January 7, and marks the earliest formation of a tropical cyclone in the Northeastern Pacific basin on record. In addition to Pali, 3 systems formed in May, 8 in June, 17 in July, 22 in August, 17 in September, 12 in October, and 4 in November.

The majority of tropical cyclones form and organize in areas of warm sea surface temperatures, usually of at least 26.5 °C (79.7 °F) and low vertical wind shear; however, there are outliers to this general rule, such as storms that manage to intensify despite high amounts of vertical wind shear. When a pre-existing tropical disturbance – usually a tropical wave or a disturbance originating in the Intertropical Convergence Zone – enters an area where the aforementioned conditions are present, the disturbance can develop into a tropical cyclone, provided it is far enough from the equator to experience a sufficiently strong Coriolis force, which causes the counterclockwise rotation of hurricanes in the Northern Hemisphere. Between the months of December and April, sea surface temperatures in the tropics, where most Northeast Pacific tropical cyclones develop, are usually too low to support significant development. Also, the presence of a semi-permanent high-pressure area known as the North Pacific High in the eastern Pacific greatly reduces tropical cyclone development in the winter months, as the North Pacific High results in vertical wind shear that causes environmental conditions to be unconducive to tropical cyclone formation. Another factor preventing tropical cyclones from forming during the winter is the presence of a semi-permanent low-pressure area called the Aleutian Low between January and April. Its effects in the central Pacific near the 160th meridian west cause tropical waves that form in the area to move northward into the Gulf of Alaska. As the disturbances travel northward, they dissipate or transition into an extratropical cyclone. The Aleutian Low's retreat in late-April allows the warmth of the Pacific High to meander in, bringing its powerful clockwise wind circulation with it. During the month of May, the Intertropical Convergence Zone migrates southward while vertical shear over the tropics decreases. As a result, the earliest tropical waves begin to form, coinciding with the start of the eastern Pacific hurricane season on May 15. During summer and early autumn, sea surface temperatures rise further, reaching 29 °C (84 °F) in July and August, well above the 26.5 °C (79.7 °F) threshold for the formation and intensification of tropical cyclones. This allows for tropical cyclones developing during that time to strengthen significantly, perhaps even rapidly.

The El Niño-Southern Oscillation also influences the frequency and intensity of hurricanes in the Northeast Pacific basin. During El Niño events, sea surface temperatures increase in the Northeast Pacific and vertical wind shear decreases. Because of this, an increase in tropical cyclone activity occurs; the opposite happens in the Atlantic basin during El Niño, where increased wind shear creates an unfavorable environment for tropical cyclone formation. Contrary to El Niño, La Niña events increase wind shear and decreases sea surface temperatures over the eastern Pacific, while reducing wind shear and increasing sea surface temperatures over the Atlantic.

Within the Northeast Pacific, the easterly trade winds cause tropical cyclones to generally move westward out into the open Pacific Ocean. Only rarely do tropical cyclones forming during the peak months of the season make landfall. Closer to the end of the season, the subtropical ridge steers some storms northwards or northeastwards. Storms influenced by this ridge may bring impacts to the western coasts of Mexico and occasionally even Central America. In the central Pacific basin, the North Pacific High keeps tropical cyclones away from the Hawaiian Islands by forcing them southwards. Combined with cooler waters around the Hawaiian Islands that tend to weaken tropical cyclones that approach them, this makes direct impacts on the Hawaiian Islands by tropical cyclones rare.

== Systems ==
Key

- † Discontinuous duration (weakened below Category 2 then restrengthened to that classification at least once)
- ‡ Intensified past Category 2 intensity after exiting basin
- # Storm made landfall, see below for further information
- § Pressure listed was not at peak intensity (Note: Prior to 1988 for the Eastern Pacific and 2001 for the Central Pacific, pressure data was only able from direct measurements by reconnaissance aircraft that penetrated the storm or reports from ships and land-based weather stations, or estimates derived from satellite imagery. Should any reading or estimate be available, the lowest is listed below.)

Name	Dates as a Category 2 hurricane (Note: Dates are given in Coordinated Universal Time.)	Duration (hours)	Sustained wind speeds	Pressure	Areas affected	Deaths	Damage (USD) (Note: All damage values are in USD of their respective years.)	Refs
Two	August 13–14, 1957	12	105 mph (165 km/h)	987 hPa (29.15 inHg)§	None	—N/a	—N/a	
Nine	September 8, 1958	6	105 mph (165 km/h)	982 hPa (29.00 inHg)	None	—N/a	—N/a	
Francesca	July 3–4, 1970	24	100 mph (155 km/h)	991 hPa (29.26 inHg)§	None	—N/a	—N/a	
Lorraine	August 22–23, 1970	18	100 mph (155 km/h)	963 hPa (28.44 inHg)	None	—N/a	—N/a	
Patricia	October 6–9, 1970	78	110 mph (175 km/h)	972 hPa (28.70 inHg)	None	—N/a	—N/a	
Agatha	May 24, 1971	6	100 mph (155 km/h)	972 hPa (28.70 inHg)	Mexico#	—N/a	Unknown	
Bridget	June 16, 1971	6	100 mph (155 km/h)	998 hPa (29.47 inHg)§	Mexico#	17	$40 million	
Hilary	July 30, 1971	6	100 mph (155 km/h)	964 hPa (28.47 inHg)	None	—N/a	—N/a	
Nanette	September 7, 1971	6	100 mph (155 km/h)	984 hPa (29.06 inHg)	Baja California Sur	—N/a	—N/a	
Diana	August 14, 1972	24	110 mph (175 km/h)	968 hPa (28.59 inHg)	Hawaii	—N/a	$75 thousand	
Joanne	October 2–3, 1972	18	100 mph (155 km/h)	971 hPa (28.67 inHg)	Baja California, California, Arizona, New Mexico#	1	Unknown	
Irah	September 24–25, 1973	24	110 mph (175 km/h)	955 hPa (28.20 inHg)	Mexico, Baja California Sur#	—N/a	Unknown	
Katherine	October 2, 1973	24	100 mph (155 km/h)	978 hPa (28.88 inHg)	None	—N/a	—N/a	
Gretchen	July 19, 1974	6	100 mph (155 km/h)	982 hPa (29.00 inHg)	Baja California Sur	—N/a	—N/a	
Orlene	September 24, 1974	6	105 mph (165 km/h)	Unknown	Mexico, Arizona#	—N/a	—N/a	
Ilsa	August 22–25, 1975	72	105 mph (165 km/h)	Unknown	None	—N/a	—N/a	
Diana	July 18, 1976	6	100 mph (155 km/h)	Unknown	None	—N/a	—N/a	
Kate	September 27, 1976	12	100 mph (155 km/h)	971 hPa (28.67 inHg)	Hawaii	—N/a	—N/a	
Florence	September 22, 1977	6	105 mph (165 km/h)	Unknown	California	—N/a	—N/a	
John	August 25, 1978	6	105 mph (165 km/h)	Unknown	None	—N/a	—N/a	
Kristy	August 21–22, 1978	42	105 mph (165 km/h)	Unknown	None	—N/a	—N/a	
Andres	June 4, 1979	6	100 mph (155 km/h)	Unknown	Mexico#	2	Minimal	
Howard	August 4, 1980	12	105 mph (165 km/h)	Unknown	Southern California, Baja California Peninsula	—N/a	—N/a	
Isis	August 8, 1980	6	100 mph (155 km/h)	Unknown	None	—N/a	—N/a	
Fernanda	August 10–11, 1981	30	105 mph (165 km/h)	Unknown	None	—N/a	—N/a	
Norman	September 14–15, 1982	36	105 mph (165 km/h)	Unknown	None	—N/a	—N/a	
Paul	September 29–30, 1982	30	110 mph (175 km/h)	Unknown	Guatemala, El Salvador, Baja California, Northwest Mexico, United States#	1,625	$520 million	
Adolph	May 24–25, 1983	36	110 mph (175 km/h)	Unknown	Southwestern Mexico#	—N/a	Minimal	
Ismael	August 11, 1983	6	100 mph (155 km/h)	Unknown	Baja California Peninsula, California, Nevada, Utah, and Arizona	5	$19 million	
Cristina	June 20, 1984	18	105 mph (165 km/h)	Unknown	None	—N/a	—N/a	
Fausto	July 5–7, 1984	54	110 mph (175 km/h)	Unknown	Baja California Sur	—N/a	—N/a	
Odile	September 22, 1984	12	105 mph (165 km/h)	Unknown	Southwestern Mexico#	21	Unknown	
Waldo	October 9, 1985	6	105 mph (165 km/h)	982 hPa (29.00 inHg)	Sinaloa, New Mexico, Texas, Kansas#	1	Unknown	
Paine	October 10, 1986	6	100 mph (155 km/h)	Unknown	Mexico, inland United States#	—N/a	Unknown	
Eugene	July 25, 1987	6	100 mph (155 km/h)	Unknown	Western Mexico#	3	$142 million	
Jova	August 17–18, 1987	12	105 mph (165 km/h)	Unknown	None	—N/a	—N/a	
Peke	September 24–27, 1987	90	105 mph (165 km/h)‡	Unknown	None	—N/a	—N/a	
Iva	August 7–9, 1988	42	105 mph (165 km/h)	968 hPa (28.59 inHg)	None	—N/a	—N/a	
Lane	September 23–24, 1988	24	105 mph (165 km/h)	970 hPa (28.64 inHg)	None	—N/a	—N/a	
Genevieve	July 15–16, 1990	30	105 mph (165 km/h)	970 hPa (28.64 inHg)	None	—N/a	—N/a	
Vance	October 26, 1990	24	100 mph (155 km/h)	975 hPa (28.79 inHg)	Southwestern Mexico, Central America	—N/a	—N/a	
Nora	November 9–10, 1991	24	105 mph (165 km/h)	970 hPa (28.64 inHg)	Sinaloa, Nayarit	—N/a	—N/a	
Georgette	July 17–22, 1992	84†	110 mph (175 km/h)	975 hPa (28.79 inHg)	None	—N/a	—N/a	
Roslyn	September 23, 1992	6	100 mph (155 km/h)	975 hPa (28.79 inHg)	None	—N/a	—N/a	
Calvin	July 6–7, 1993	36	110 mph (175 km/h)	966 hPa (28.53 inHg)	Western Mexico, Baja California Sur#	37	$32 million	
Carlotta	June 30–July 2, 1994	54	105 mph (165 km/h)	967 hPa (28.56 inHg)	None	—N/a	—N/a	
Kristy	August 31–September 1, 1994	18	105 mph (165 km/h)	992 hPa (29.29 inHg)§	None	—N/a	—N/a	
Rosa	October 13–14, 1994	18	105 mph (165 km/h)	974 hPa (28.76 inHg)	Mexico, Texas#	4	Unknown	
Henriette	September 4, 1995	6	100 mph (155 km/h)	970 hPa (28.64 inHg)	Northern Mexico, Baja California Peninsula#	—N/a	Minimal	
Alma	June 22–24, 1996	42	105 mph (165 km/h)	969 hPa (28.61 inHg)	Western Mexico#	20	Unknown	
Rick	November 9, 1997	6	100 mph (155 km/h)	973 hPa (28.73 inHg)	Mexico#	—N/a	Unknown	
Adrian	June 20–21, 1999	12	100 mph (155 km/h)	973 hPa (28.73 inHg)	Mexico	6	Minimal	
Eugene	August 9–10, 1999	42	110 mph (175 km/h)	964 hPa (28.47 inHg)	None	—N/a	—N/a	
Aletta	May 25, 2000	30	105 mph (165 km/h)	970 hPa (28.64 inHg)	Southwestern Mexico	—N/a	—N/a	
Lane	September 10, 2000	24	100 mph (155 km/h)	964 hPa (28.47 inHg)	Socorro Island, Baja California Peninsula, Southwestern United States	—N/a	—N/a	
Flossie	August 29–30, 2001	18	105 mph (165 km/h)	972 hPa (28.70 inHg)	Northwestern Mexico, Baja California Sur	—N/a	Moderate	
Gil	September 6–7, 2001	18	100 mph (155 km/h)	975 hPa (28.79 inHg)	None	—N/a	—N/a	
Douglas	July 22–23, 2002	30	105 mph (165 km/h)	970 hPa (28.64 inHg)	None	—N/a	—N/a	
Ignacio	August 24–25, 2003	18	105 mph (165 km/h)	970 hPa (28.64 inHg)	Baja California Peninsula, Sonora, California#	2	$21 million	
Jimena	August 30–31, 2003	42	105 mph (165 km/h)	970 hPa (28.64 inHg)	Hawaii	—N/a	—N/a	
Marty	September 22, 2003	6	100 mph (155 km/h)	970 hPa (28.64 inHg)	Baja California Peninsula, Sonora, Sinaloa, Arizona#	12	$100 million	
Nora	October 4–5, 2003	30	105 mph (165 km/h)	969 hPa (28.61 inHg)	Mexico, Texas#	—N/a	Minimal	
Hilary	August 22, 2005	24	105 mph (165 km/h)	970 hPa (28.64 inHg)	None	—N/a	—N/a	
Otis	October 1, 2005	12	105 mph (165 km/h)	970 hPa (28.64 inHg)	Western Mexico, Baja California Sur	—N/a	Minimal	
Hector	August 18–19, 2006	36	110 mph (175 km/h)	966 hPa (28.53 inHg)	None	—N/a	—N/a	
Paul	October 23, 2006	12	105 mph (165 km/h)	970 hPa (28.64 inHg)	Oaxaca, Guerrero, Baja California Sur, Sinaloa#	4	$3.2 million	
Sergio	November 15–16, 2006	24	110 mph (175 km/h)	965 hPa (28.50 inHg)	Guerrero	—N/a	—N/a	
Elida	July 16–17, 2008	18	105 mph (165 km/h)	970 hPa (28.64 inHg)	Southwestern Mexico, Hawaii	—N/a	—N/a	
Carlos	July 15, 2009	12	105 mph (165 km/h)	971 hPa (28.67 inHg)	None	—N/a	—N/a	
Irwin	October 7–8, 2011	12	100 mph (155 km/h)	976 hPa (28.82 inHg)	Western Mexico	—N/a	—N/a	
Carlotta	June 15–16, 2012	18	110 mph (175 km/h)	973 hPa (28.73 inHg)	Southwestern Mexico#	7	$12.4 million	
Fabio	July 14–16, 2012	36	110 mph (175 km/h)	966 hPa (28.53 inHg)	Baja California Peninsula, Western United States	—N/a	—N/a	
Henriette	August 8–9, 2013	18	105 mph (165 km/h)	976 hPa (28.82 inHg)	None	—N/a	—N/a	
Vance	November 3–4, 2014	42	110 mph (175 km/h)	964 hPa (28.47 inHg)	Western Mexico, Northwestern Mexico	—N/a	—N/a	
Guillermo	July 31–August 2, 2015	54	110 mph (175 km/h)	967 hPa (28.56 inHg)	Hawaii, Northern California	—N/a	—N/a	
Oho	October 7, 2015	18	110 mph (175 km/h)	957 hPa (28.26 inHg)	Western Canada, Alaska	—N/a	—N/a	
Pali	January 12–13, 2016	12	100 mph (155 km/h)	977 hPa (28.85 inHg)	Kiribati	—N/a	—N/a	
Celia	July 11–12, 2016	18	100 mph (155 km/h)	972 hPa (28.70 inHg)	Hawaii	2	—N/a	
Orlene	September 12–13, 2016	24	110 mph (175 km/h)	967 hPa (28.56 inHg)	None	—N/a	—N/a	
Dora	June 26–27, 2017	18	105 mph (165 km/h)	974 hPa (28.76 inHg)	Southwestern Mexico	—N/a	Minimal	
Hilary	July 25–27, 2017	48	110 mph (175 km/h)	969 hPa (28.61 inHg)	Southwestern Mexico	—N/a	—N/a	
Fabio	July 3–4, 2018	36	110 mph (175 km/h)	964 hPa (28.47 inHg)	None	—N/a	—N/a	
John	August 7–8, 2018	18	110 mph (175 km/h)	964 hPa (28.47 inHg)	Revillagigedo Islands, Baja California Peninsula, Southwestern Mexico, Southwestern United States	—N/a	—N/a	
Miriam	August 31–September 1, 2018	6	100 mph (155 km/h)	974 hPa (28.76 inHg)	None	—N/a	—N/a	
Elida	August 11, 2020	6	105 mph (165 km/h)	971 hPa (28.67 inHg)	Mexico, Socorro Island	—N/a	—N/a	
Olaf	September 9, 2021	3	105 mph (165 km/h)	975 hPa (28.79 inHg)	Baja California Sur#	1	$10 million	
Rick	October 25, 2021	12	105 mph (165 km/h)	977 hPa (28.85 inHg)	Southwestern and Western Mexico#	1	$10 million	
Agatha	May 29–30, 2022	27	110 mph (175 km/h)	964 hPa (28.47 inHg)	Southwestern Mexico#	9	$50 million	
Kay	September 7, 2022	6	100 mph (155 km/h)	968 hPa (28.59 inHg)	Southwestern Mexico, Socorro Island, Baja California peninsula#	5	$10.6 million	
Adrian	June 30 – July 1, 2023	18	105 mph (165 km/h)	970 hPa (28.64 inHg)	None	—N/a	—N/a	
Narda	September 24, 2025	24	105 mph (165 km/h)	970 hPa (28.64 inHg)	Western Mexico	5	Unknown	
Fausto	July 24–26, 2026	42	105 mph (165 km/h)	967 hPa (28.56 inHg)	Revillagigedo Islands, Hawaiian Islands, Coastal California	—N/a	—N/a	

== Landfalls ==
Landfalls by month
Month	Number of storms
May	2
June	4
July	2
August	1
September	7
October	6
November	1

Out of the 83 Category 2 hurricanes in the east and central Pacific, 23 have made landfall as a tropical cyclone, collectively resulting in 27 landfalls. As tropical cyclones tend to weaken before landfall due to the effects of land interaction, only seven Category 2 hurricanes actually made landfall while still at Category 2 strength. Five storms made landfall twice each, namely Irah (1973), Paul (1982), Adolph (1983), Calvin (1993), and Marty (2003); Paul made both landfalls at Category 2 strength. No Category 2 Pacific hurricane to date has made landfall more than twice. Multiple Category 2 hurricanes made landfall only in 2 years: 1971, with two systems (Agatha and Bridget) making landfall, and 2003, with three systems (Ignacio, Marty, and Nora) making landfall.

Name	Year	Category 2	Category 1	Tropical storm	Tropical depression	Refs
Agatha	1971	—	Guerrero state (May 24)	—	—	
Bridget	1971	—	—	Colima state (June 17)	—	
Joanne	1972	—	—	Baja California state (October 7)	—	
Irah	1973	—	Baja California Sur state (September 25)	Sinaloa state (September 26)	—	
Orlene	1974	Sinaloa state (September 24)	—	—	—	
Andres	1979	—	Guerrero state (June 4)	—	—	
Paul	1982	Baja California Sur state (September 28), Sinaloa state (September 29)	—	—	—	
Adolph	1983	—	—	Jalisco state (May 27), Sinaloa state (May 28)	—	
Odile	1984	—	—	Guerrero state (September 22)	—	
Waldo	1985	—	Sinaloa state (October 9)	—	—	
Paine	1986	—	Sinaloa state (October 2)	—	—	
Eugene	1987	—	Jalisco state (July 25)	—	—	
Calvin	1993	Jalisco state (July 7)	—	—	Baja California Sur state (July 8)	
Rosa	1994	—	Sinaloa state (October 14)	—	—	
Henriette	1995	Baja California Sur state (September 4)	—	—	—	
Alma	1996	Michoacán state (June 24)	—	—	—	
Rick	1997	—	Oaxaca state (November 10)	—	—	
Ignacio	2003	—	Baja California Sur state (August 25)	—	—	
Marty	2003	Baja California Sur state (September 22)	—	—	Sonora state (September 24)	
Nora	2003	—	—	—	Sinaloa state (October 9)	
Paul	2006	—	—	—	Sinaloa state (October 26)	
Carlotta	2012	Oaxaca state (June 16)	—	—	—	
Olaf	2021	Baja California Sur state (September 9)	—	—	—	
Rick	2021	Michoacán state (October 25)	—	—	—	
Agatha	2022	Oaxaca state (May 30)	—	—	—	
Kay	2022	—	Baja California Sur state (September 8)	—	—	

== See also ==
- List of Eastern Pacific tropical storms
- List of Category 1 Pacific hurricanes
- List of Category 3 Pacific hurricanes
- List of Category 4 Pacific hurricanes
- List of Category 5 Pacific hurricanes
- List of Pacific hurricanes
- Pacific hurricane season
