= Hurricane Rick (2021) =

Category 2 Pacific hurricane in 2021

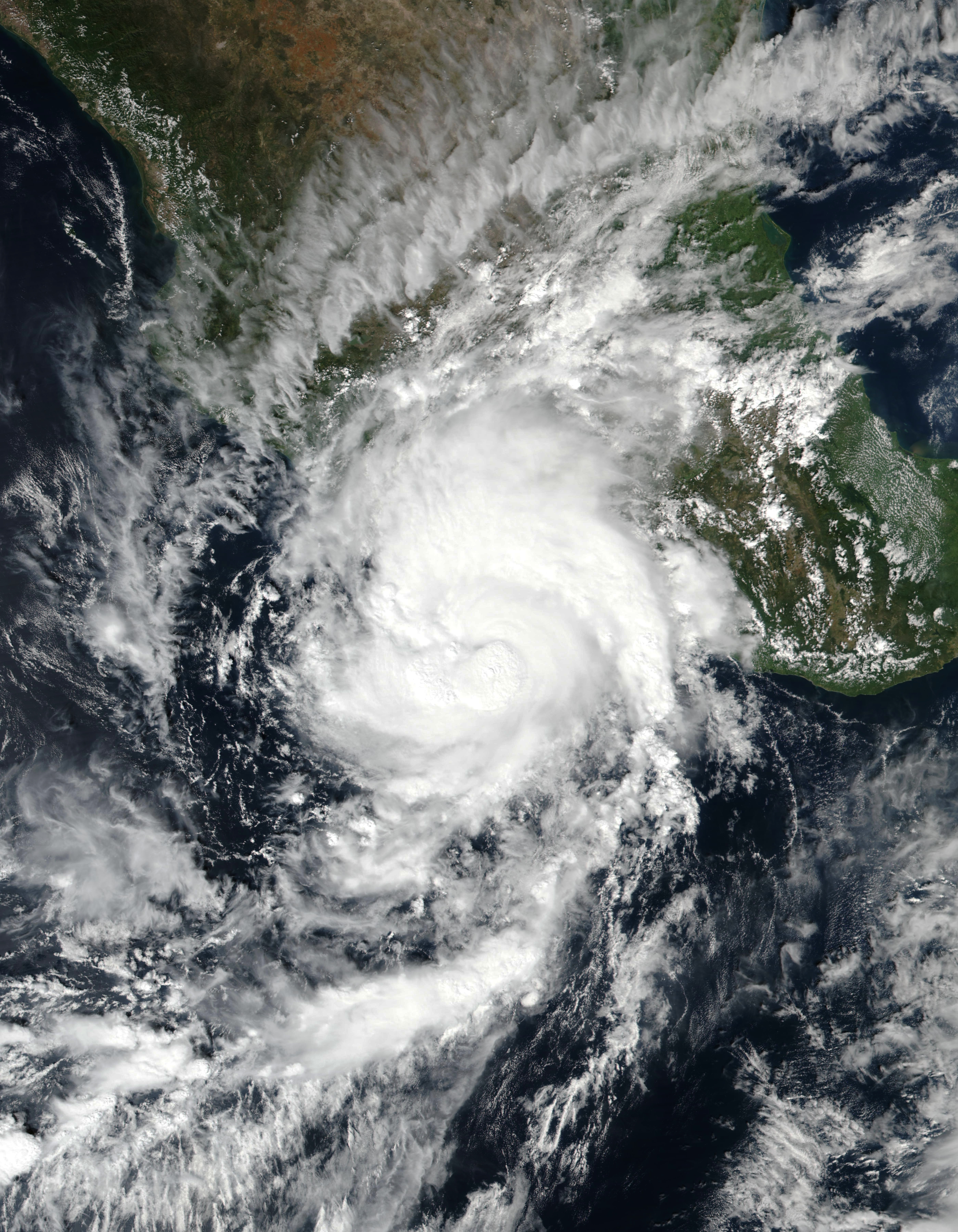
- Hurricane Rick nearing landfall near Lázaro Cárdenas on October 24

Meteorological history
- Formed: October 22, 2021
- Dissipated: October 25, 2021

Category 2 hurricane
- 1-minute sustained (SSHWS/NWS)
- Highest winds: 105 mph (165 km/h)
- Lowest pressure: 977 mbar (hPa); 28.85 inHg

Overall effects
- Fatalities: 1 total
- Damage: $25.8 million (2021 USD)
- Areas affected: Southwestern and Western Mexico
- IBTrACS
- Part of the 2021 Pacific hurricane season

Hurricane Rick was a strong tropical cyclone that struck the southwestern coast of Mexico in late October 2021. Rick was the overall seventeenth named system and the eighth hurricane of the 2021 Pacific hurricane season, as well as the fifth named storm and fourth hurricane to make landfall along the Pacific coast of Mexico in 2021.

Rick developed from a low-pressure area off the southern coast of Mexico that initially formed on October 21, 2021. The system organized into a tropical depression at 12:00 UTC the next day, and strengthened to a tropical storm six hours later, receiving the name Rick. In an environment of low wind shear and high sea surface temperatures, Rick rapidly intensified into a hurricane early on October 23. After briefly weakening the next day, Rick resumed intensifying and achieved its peak intensity on October 25 as a Category 2 hurricane with maximum sustained winds of 105 mph (170 km/h) and a minimum barometric pressure of 977 mbar (28.9 inHg). Rick made landfall at peak intensity later that day on the Mexican state of Guerrero. Rick quickly weakened as it moved inland, first to a tropical storm over the state of Michoacán before dissipating entirely late that day over Jalisco.

A total of 2,260 shelters were set up across five states in preparation for Rick's landfall. Floodwaters from the hurricane stranded cars, cut off and destroyed roads, and uprooted trees. A man was confirmed dead after being swept away in the floods triggered by Rick. In all, Rick had caused $25.8 million (2021 USD) in damage.

== Meteorological history ==
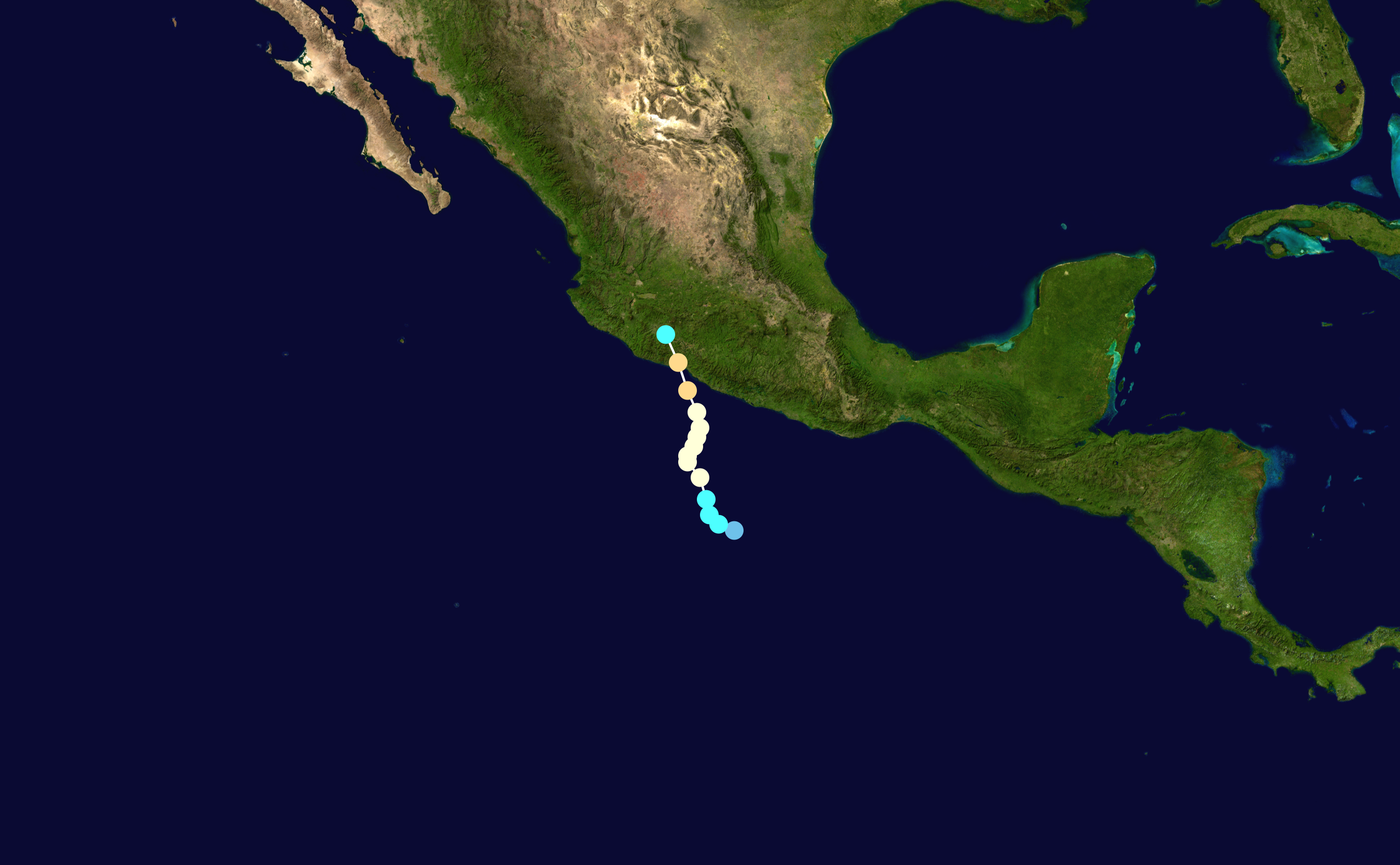
Map plotting the storm's track and intensity, according to the Saffir–Simpson scale Map key Saffir–Simpson scale Tropical depression (≤38 mph, ≤62 km/h) Tropical storm (39–73 mph, 63–118 km/h) Category 1 (74–95 mph, 119–153 km/h) Category 2 (96–110 mph, 154–177 km/h) Category 3 (111–129 mph, 178–208 km/h) Category 4 (130–156 mph, 209–251 km/h) Category 5 (≥157 mph, ≥252 km/h) Unknown Storm type Tropical cyclone Subtropical cyclone Extratropical cyclone, remnant low, tropical disturbance, or monsoon depression

On October 18, the National Hurricane Center (NHC) started highlighting the chances of development of a low pressure area offshore the Pacific coast of Mexico. An area of disturbed weather became identifiable south of the coasts of Guatemala and El Salvador on the next day. Shower and thunderstorm activity was initially scattered, and only gradual development was expected, although the NHC noted that the system would likely become a tropical depression by October 24. On the afternoon of October 21, a broad area of low pressure developed just south of the Gulf of Tehuantepec. Shower activity gradually became better organized, although an advanced scatterometer pass early on October 22 revealed that the system had not developed a closed wind circulation. However, a rapid increase in organization soon occurred, and following a Dvorak classification of T2.0/35 mph (55 km/h), the NHC upgraded the low pressure system into a tropical depression at 15:00 UTC on October 21.

At the time of genesis, the depression was moving briskly to the west under the influence of a ridge to its north. Situated within an environment of little vertical wind shear, high moisture, and of warm sea surface temperatures near 86 °F (30 °C), the depression was upgraded into a tropical storm that evening after an increase in curved band features and upper-level outflow in all directions. A central dense overcast subsequently developed, and microwave imagery indicated the development of a ring of deep convection, which is often a precursor to an eye, which prompted the NHC to re-assess the intensity of Rick at 70 mph (110 km/h) and forecast rapid deepening at 09:00 UTC on October 23. That afternoon, Rick attained hurricane status as the cyclone began to curve north-northwestward in response to a weakness in the ridge. An eye briefly became apparent in visible satellite imagery and following measurements from a Hurricane Hunter aircraft, the NHC set the intensity of the storm at 90 mph (150 km/h). During the next 18 to 24 hours, the hurricane weakened slightly as it tracked north; the cause of this arrested development phase was 15 to 25 mph (30 to 35 km/h) of wind shear and an environment of less than 50% relative humidity. However, microwave imagery showed a 25 mi (35 km) wide closed eyewall had re-developed by the evening of October 23, a sign that Rick had resumed intensification. Based on wind measurements from a Hurricane Hunter aircraft, Rick was upgraded into a Category 2 hurricane on the Saffir-Simpson scale at 06:00 UTC on October 25. The storm also attained its peak intensity of 105 mph (165 km/h) at the same time along with a minimum barometric pressure of 977 mbar (28.9 inHg). At 10:00 UTC, Rick made landfall between Lázaro Cárdenas and Zihuatanejo while at its peak intensity. The system then rapidly weakened while it moved further inland, towards the mountainous terrain of Mexico. Early on October 26, Rick dissipated over west-central Mexico.

== Preparations and impact ==
Under the anticipation that Rick would make landfall along the southwestern coast of Mexico, a hurricane watch was issued on the afternoon of October 22 from Zihuatanejo, Guerrero, to Punta San Telmo, Michoacán, with tropical storm watches posted east and west of the hurricane watch area. Within 18 hours, these watches were upgraded to warnings. The Servicio Meteorológico Nacional warned that the states of Jalisco, Morelos, Puebla, Mexico City, Nayarit and the State of Mexico could see heavy rainfall, with the potential of flooding. Four reservoirs in Colima and Guererro, along with four rivers in the latter, as well as three rivers and dams in Michoacán, four rivers and three dams in Oaxaca were monitored for flooding. A total of 2,260 temporary shelters were set up for possible evacuees across five states. Three ports in Guerrero, Acapulco, Puerto Marqués and Zihuatanejo along with Lázaro Cárdenas in Michoacán were closed on October 23. In Colima, a blue alert was issued.

While still at sea, Rick was responsible for 3 m (9.8 ft) waves along coastal areas of Guerrero while winds from the outer fringes of the storm's circulation uprooted trees, although there was no major damage across the state. A 35-year-old man was killed after he was swept away in the municipality of Tepoztlán. Across Guerrero, 37 homes were flooded, including 30 in the municipality of Tecpan de Galeana and 5 in Acapulco, which resulted in 42 families seeking shelter. Two rivers overflowed their banks in Zihuatanejo and two more overflowed their banks in the municipality of Tecpan de Galeana. Statewide, seventy-five trees were uprooted and six roads were destroyed. Across Zihuatanejo and Acapulco, cars were seen stranded in floodwaters and the Acapulco-Zihuatanejo highway was cut off by floodwaters in the municipality of Petatlán. Blackouts were reported in the Costa Chica and Costa Grande regions of Guerrero and extended as far east as in Acapulco. However, no injuries were reported. The hurricane caused a damage valued 521 million pesos (US$25.8 million) in Guerrero.

== See also ==
- Weather of 2021
- Tropical cyclones in 2021
- List of Category 2 Pacific hurricanes
- Other tropical cyclones named Rick
- Hurricane Pauline (1997)
- Hurricane Otis (2023)
