= Hurricane Pali =

Category 2 Pacific hurricane in 2016

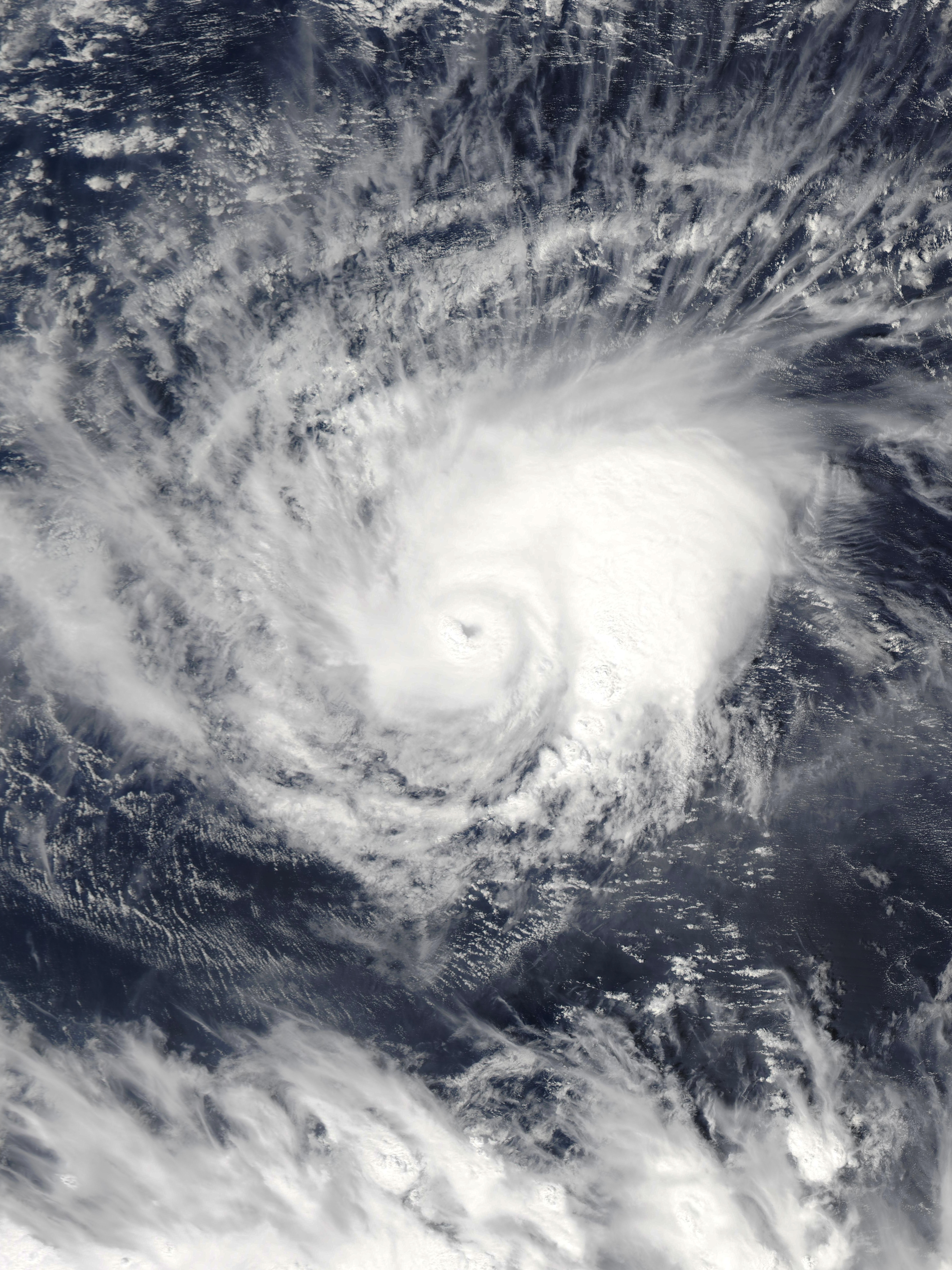
- Hurricane Pali at peak intensity, over the Central Pacific on January 13

Meteorological history
- Formed: January 7, 2016
- Remnant low: January 14, 2016
- Dissipated: January 15, 2016

Category 2 hurricane
- 1-minute sustained (SSHWS/NWS)
- Highest winds: 100 mph (155 km/h)
- Lowest pressure: 978 mbar (hPa); 28.88 inHg

Overall effects
- Fatalities: 4 total
- Damage: Unknown
- Areas affected: Kiribati
- IBTrACS /
- Part of the 2016 Pacific hurricane season

Hurricane Pali was the earliest-forming Pacific hurricane on record, being the first Pacific hurricane to occur in January since Hurricane Ekeka of 1992. The first tropical cyclone of the 2016 Pacific hurricane season, Pali originated as an area of low pressure within a persistent trough, near the equator on January 6, 2016. Deep convection gradually built up around the center of the disturbance as the system curved northward, before it organized into a tropical depression on the next day, making the system the earliest recorded tropical cyclone in the Pacific hurricane basin. The system quickly intensified into a tropical storm, resulting in it being named Pali. During the next few days, Pali slowly moved northward while slowly curving towards the west, strengthening somewhat before weakening due to the presence of wind shear. On January 10, Pali slowly turned eastward and proceeded to re-strengthen as wind shear diminished.

On January 12, Pali strengthened into a Category 1 hurricane on the Saffir–Simpson scale (SSWHS) while curving towards the south. The next day, Pali reached its peak intensity as a Category 2 hurricane, with 1-minute maximum sustained winds of 100 mph (155 km/h) (Note: All values for sustained wind estimates are sustained over 1 minute, unless otherwise specified.) and a minimum central pressure of 978 mbar (hPa; 28.88 inHg). Afterward, Pali quickly began to weaken, as the storm encountered stronger wind shear, with the storm weakening into a Category 1 hurricane several hours later, before weakening into a tropical storm later that day. On January 14, Pali weakened into a tropical depression before degenerating into a remnant low the next day, since conditions became increasingly hostile. Later that day, Pali's remnants dissipated near the same location where they had formed roughly a week ago. Pali formed and tracked near the equator, forming at a latitude of 3.3°N and tracking as low as 2.6°N as a tropical depression. This made Pali the second-lowest latitude tropical cyclone on record in the Western Hemisphere at the time, which was extremely unusual, given the unfavorable conditions that are usually in place around the equator.

Pali had severe impacts in Kiribati, grounding a cargo ship and killing four people, in addition to causing major coastal flooding, although the total amount of damage was not specified in the island nation's report to the World Meteorological Organisation (WMO).

== Background and records ==
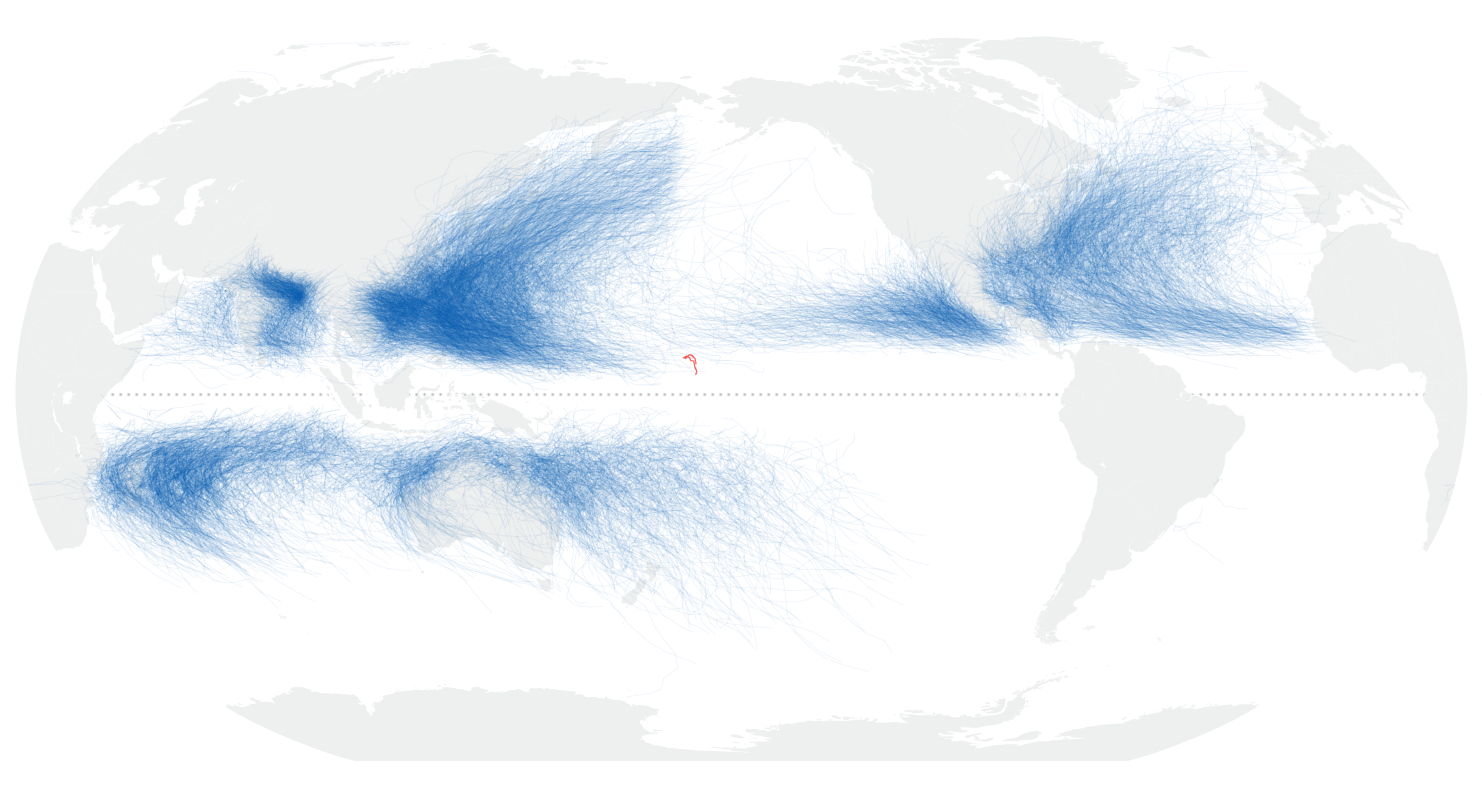
The track of Hurricane Pali (in red), compared to those of the other tropical cyclones in the NOAA's database, dating from 1842 to 2015

As currently defined, the Pacific hurricane season lasts from May 15 to November 30, the period in which tropical cyclones are most likely to develop across the basin. Occasionally, systems develop outside these seasons, most frequently in May or December, though some off-season storms also develop in January. Activity in January is extremely rare; only two systems other than Pali have been recorded since 1949: Tropical Storm Winona in 1989 and Hurricane Ekeka in 1992, which became a Category 3 major hurricane. Pali was the earliest tropical cyclone recorded in the Central Pacific basin, forming on January 7, beating Tropical Storm Winona by six days. Pali was also the earliest recorded Central Pacific hurricane, reaching hurricane intensity on January 12, beating the previous record-holder, Hurricane Ekeka, by 19 days.

Pali also formed and tracked closer to the equator than any other storm recorded in the Pacific hurricane basin. Pali became a tropical depression near 3.3°N. During its final days as a tropical cyclone, Pali reached a minimum latitude of 2.6°N as a tropical depression, making it the second-lowest latitude tropical cyclone on record in the Western Hemisphere, just behind Tropical Depression Nine-C, which attained a minimum latitude of 2.2°N just two weeks prior; no other tropical cyclone in the National Oceanic and Atmospheric Administration (NOAA)'s records in the Central Pacific had ever ventured that close to the equator, dating back to 1842. Tropical cyclones usually do not develop that close to the equator, due to the strength of the Coriolis force at those latitudes, which is too weak to induce the spin necessary to form tropical cyclones. Prior to the storm's dissipation, when Pali curved back towards the south, some meteorologists speculated that Pali could cross over the equator into the Southern Hemisphere, given the steering currents in place, which would have been an extremely rare occurrence had the storm done so.

Unrelated to Pali, the formation of Hurricane Alex over the North Atlantic in mid-January coincided with Pali's development over the Central Pacific. This marked the first occurrence of simultaneous January tropical cyclones between these two basins.

== Meteorological history ==
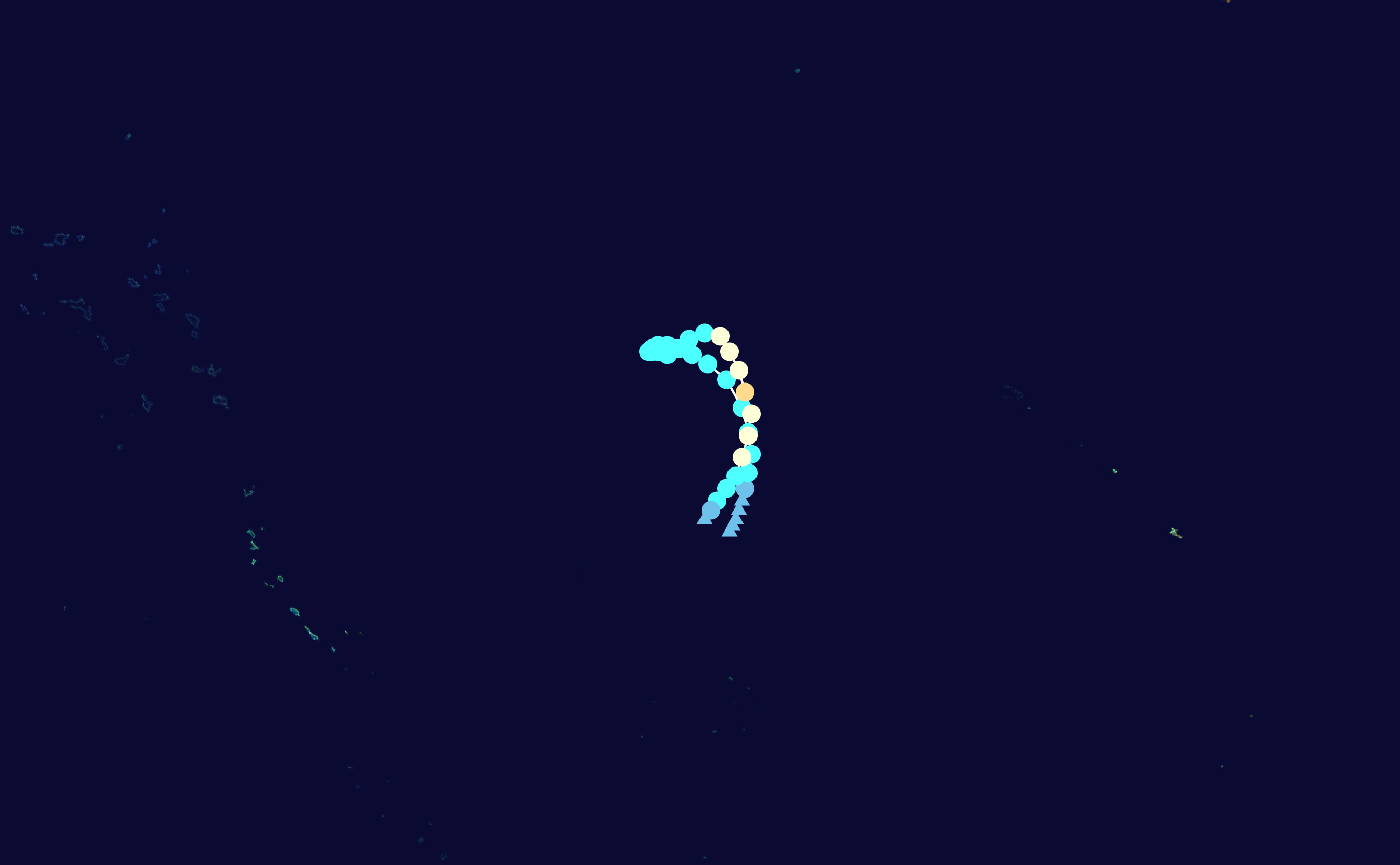
Map plotting the storm's track and intensity, according to the Saffir–Simpson scale Map key Saffir–Simpson scale Tropical depression (≤38 mph, ≤62 km/h) Tropical storm (39–73 mph, 63–118 km/h) Category 1 (74–95 mph, 119–153 km/h) Category 2 (96–110 mph, 154–177 km/h) Category 3 (111–129 mph, 178–208 km/h) Category 4 (130–156 mph, 209–251 km/h) Category 5 (≥157 mph, ≥252 km/h) Unknown Storm type Tropical cyclone Subtropical cyclone Extratropical cyclone, remnant low, tropical disturbance, or monsoon depression

In late December 2015, a long-lived and powerful westerly wind burst—a feature commonly associated with strong El Niño events—triggered the formation of Tropical Depression Nine-C in the central North Pacific, along with its twin, Tropical Cyclone Ula, in the central South Pacific. Tropical Depression Nine-C quickly dissipated by the start of 2016, leaving behind a large area of moisture across the equatorial Pacific. The persistent, powerful westerly wind burst spurred cyclogenesis within a persistent, low-latitude, west-to-east-oriented surface trough that spanned between 1.0°N and 3.0°N latitude as far east as 155.0°W longitude, resulting in the formation of a weak area of low pressure on January 6, at the extremely low latitude of 1.9°N. The disturbance developed in an area of high wind shear, which kept the system from quickly organizing. The low and the trough drifted northward, as the subtropical ridge spanning the region was significantly weakened by a passing extratropical storm in the North Pacific. Deep convection then developed near the low and also along a broad portion of the trough; however, thunderstorms failed to concentrate around the center of the disturbance. Fueled by unusually high sea surface temperatures, estimated at 29.5 °C (85.1 °F), deep convection increased and gradually organized around the low, and the system gradually coalesced into a tropical depression by 06:00 UTC on January 7, at a latitude of 3.3°N. This marked the earliest formation of a tropical cyclone on record in the Central Pacific, surpassing 1989's Tropical Storm Winona by six days. A ridge aloft centered directly above the system enhanced its poleward anticyclonic outflow, enabling the development of deep convection around its center, and soon afterward, the system strengthened into a tropical storm, which received the name Pali, becoming the earliest tropical cyclone recorded in the northeastern Pacific.

Pali continued intensifying through the first half of January 8 and nearly reached Category 1 hurricane strength, with maximum 1-minute sustained winds reaching 70 mph (110 km/h), but easterly vertical wind shear caused by the ridge aloft increased and disrupted its center, causing the storm to start weakening and curve northwestward. Steady weakening continued through January 9, as Pali's deep convection was displaced to the west of its low-level circulation center and intermittently pulsed, later leading to a sharp decrease in the storm's intensity. By the end of that day, Pali barely maintained tropical storm strength, with the storm's 1-minute sustained winds registering at 40 mph (65 km/h). The lack of persistent deep convection resulted in Pali being a weaker system, but this permitted the storm to be more resistant to the easterly wind shear, causing its forward motion to decrease significantly. The ridge of high pressure weakened and retreated southward on January 10, which caused the vertical wind shear to gradually diminish. Afterward, Pali started re-intensifying, with persistent deep convection redeveloping near its center and within the storm's western quadrant. This shift in steering currents also caused Pali to slowly turn eastward. Pali almost completely stalled during this time, due to the absence of significant steering currents. On January 11, the ridge of high pressure moved directly over Pali, leading to the reestablishment of poleward outflow above the storm and the eventual development of southwesterly flow aloft, enabling the storm's convection to slowly increase in coverage and organization within all quadrants, and also establishing a northeastward movement. At 00:00 UTC on January 12, light vertical wind shear and high sea surface temperatures enabled Pali to strengthen into a Category 1 hurricane, becoming the earliest hurricane on record in the northeast Pacific basin, beating the previous record set by Hurricane Ekeka in 1992, by 19 days. Around the same time, the storm began curving towards the southeast, as a deep ridge developed to the north. The storm also displayed a well-defined eye by 18:00 UTC that day. Pali continued strengthening while travelling southward, and early on January 13, Pali reached its peak intensity as a Category 2 hurricane, with maximum 1-minute sustained winds of 100 mph (155 km/h) and a minimum central pressure of 978 millibars (28.9 inHg).

During the next few days, Pali rapidly weakened while turning back towards the south-southwest, due to steady increases in southerly vertical wind shear and the loss of Coriolis force. The storm's weakening trend began on January 13 and accelerated through the next day, as Pali moved back towards the area from where it had formed. The storm's eye became indistinguishable by 06:00 UTC on January 13, as the system continued to weaken. Vertical wind shear exceeded 25 mph (40 km/h) by early January 14. Further decay in the organization of the storm's deep convection caused Pali to be downgraded into a remnant low late on January 14, with the system barely being distinguishable within the surface trough where it had spent its entire life, and the storm's center dissipated by 00:00 UTC on January 15. However, Pali's remnants continued to persist for a while, before dissipating later that day. Pali completed a broad and looping track, dissipating approximately 50 nmi (58 mi; 93 km) from where it had initially developed. While weakening, Pali reached a minimum latitude of 2.6°N, making it the second-lowest latitude tropical cyclone on record in the Western Hemisphere, behind Tropical Depression Nine-C, which attained a minimum latitude of 2.2°N just two weeks prior.

Structural evolution of Hurricane Pali from a tropical disturbance into a hurricane
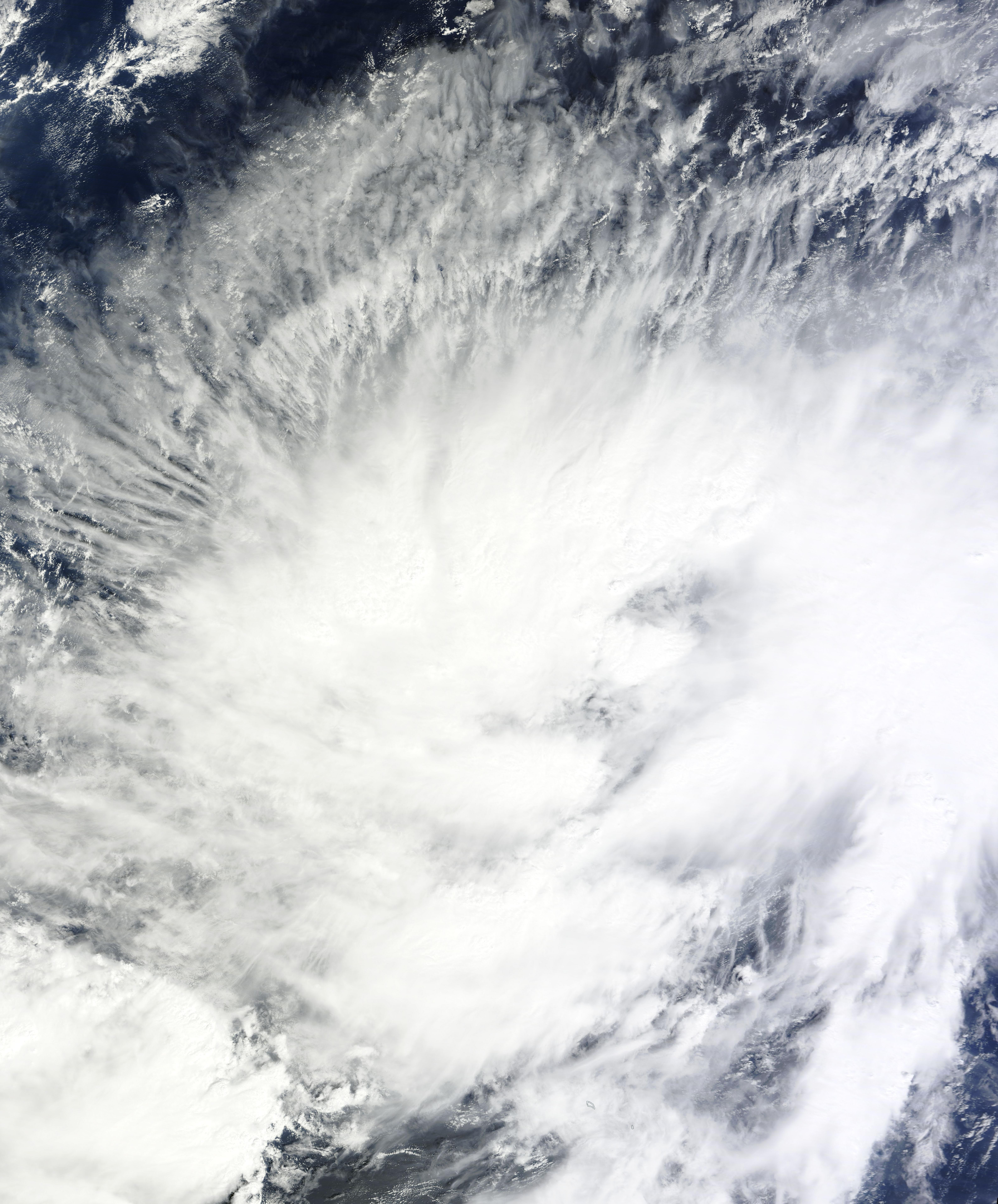
The precursor disturbance on January 6. Note organization of thunderstorms around the center of the storm.

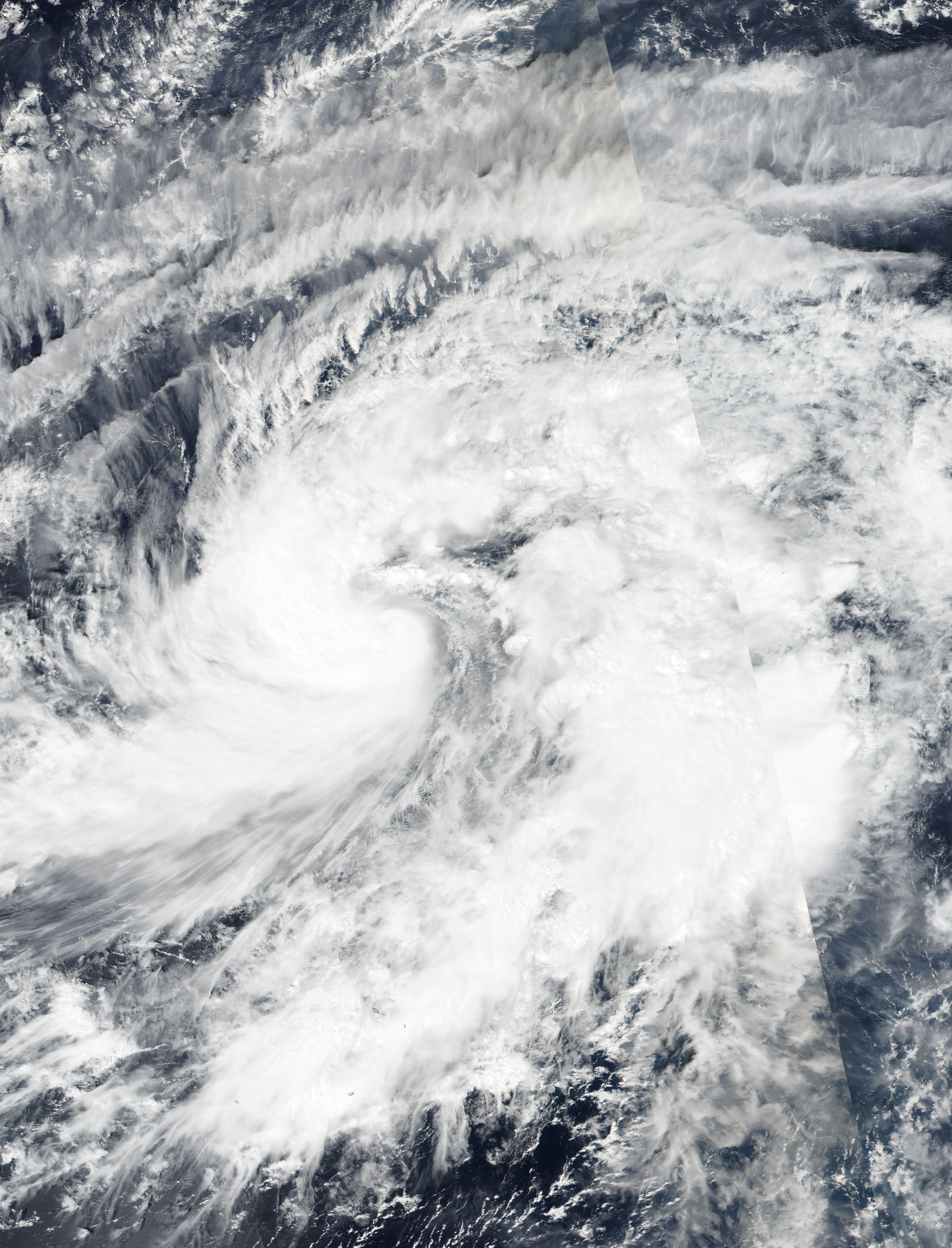
A low-level circulation develops, convection wraps around the center, and winds increase to tropical storm-force, signifying the system's development into a tropical storm.

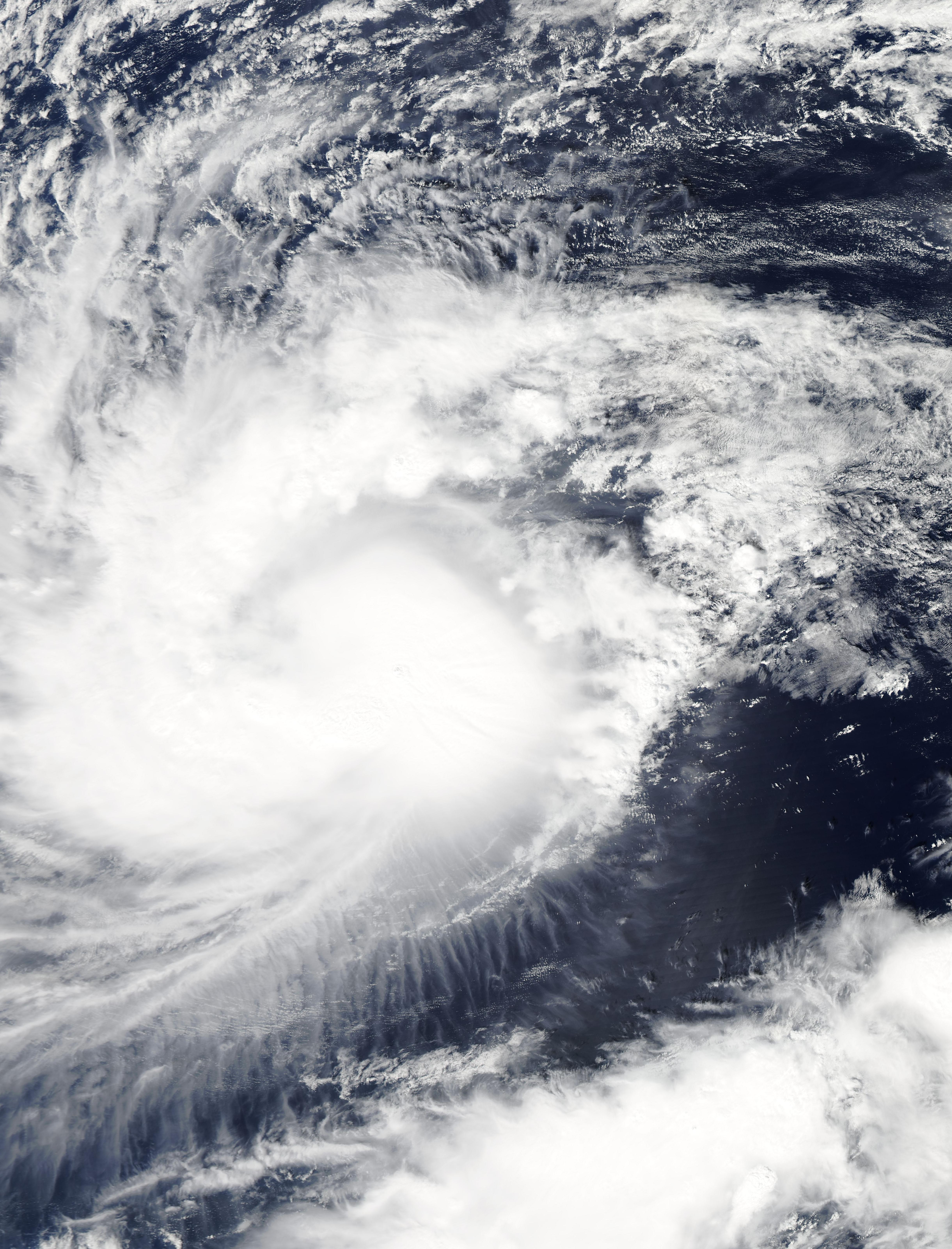
Convection concentrates around the center of circulation and increases, indicating the storm's strengthening trend

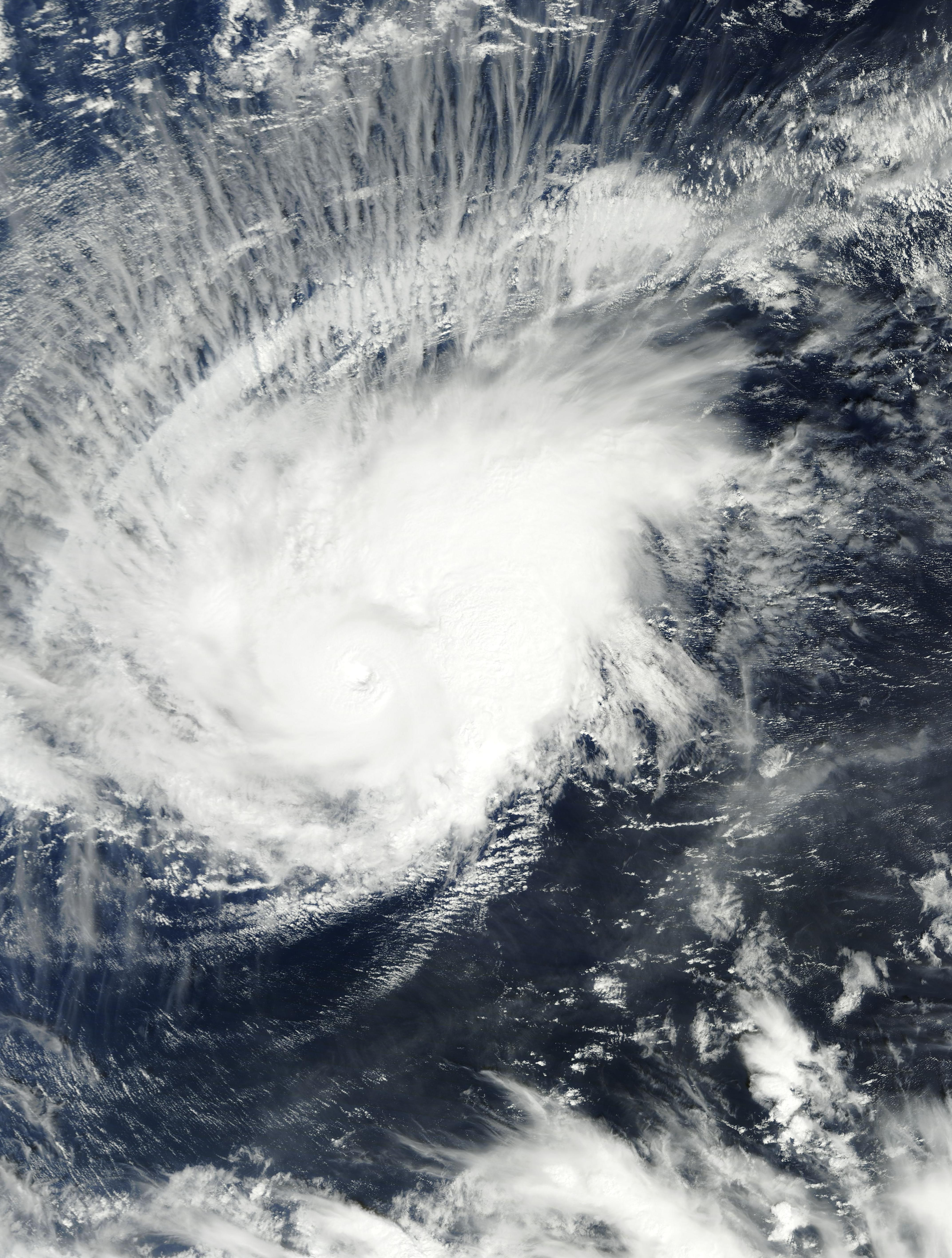
Banding features become increasingly defined, and an eye appears, signifying the storm's intensification into a hurricane

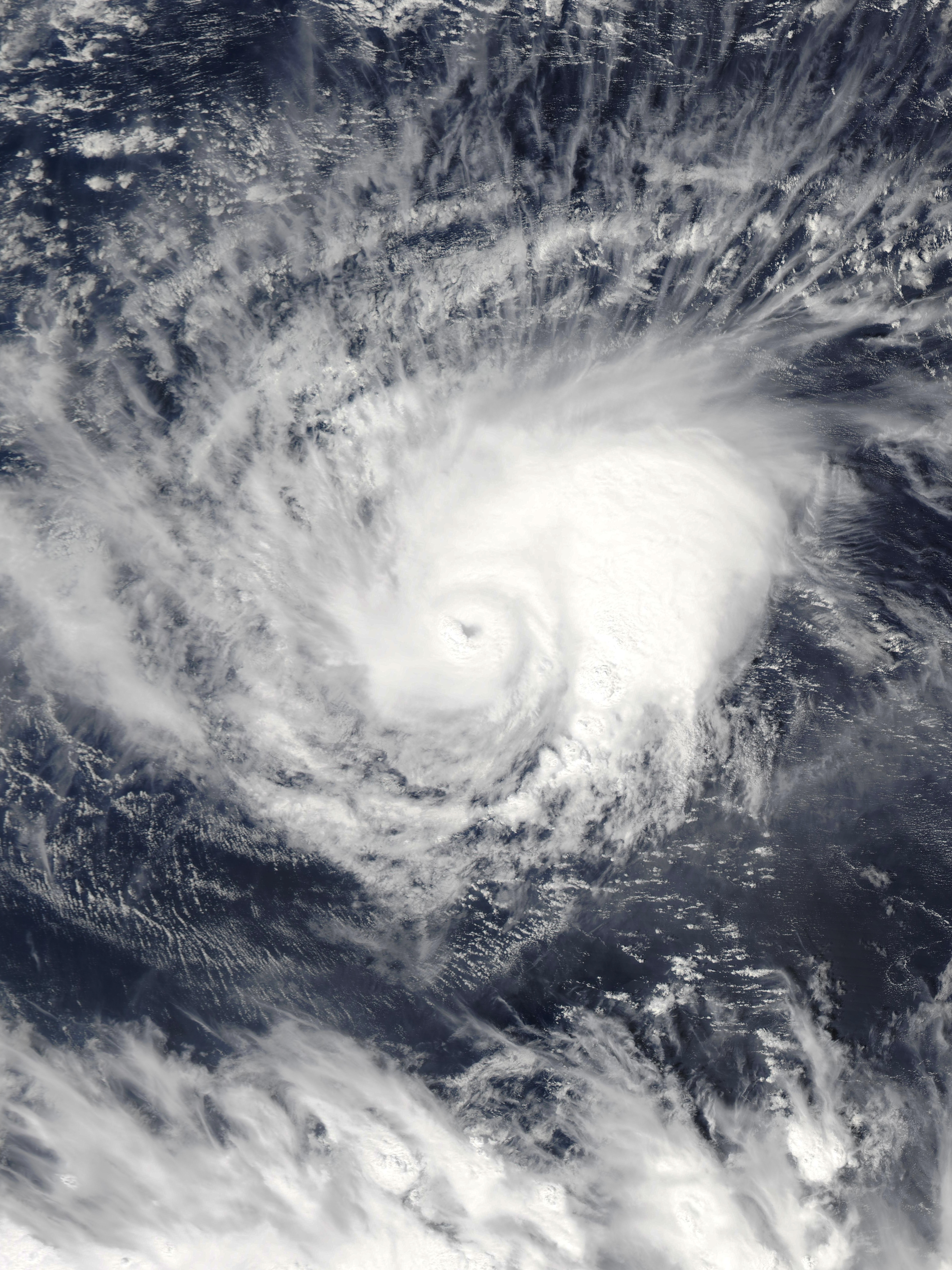
The storm peaks as a Category 2 hurricane, with a small, distinct eye visible in the center of the storm

== Impacts ==
In the 19th session of the World Meteorological Organisation (WMO)'s Tropical Cyclone Committee, in July 2021, Kiribati reported that Hurricane Pali had severe impacts in Kiribati. While Pali caused a significant amount of property damage, the exact amount of damage was not given in the report to the WMO. Pali caused a cargo ship to run aground on the coast of Kiribati, killing four people. Additionally, Pali's storm surge combined with the Spring Tide and the El Niño-induced above-average sea level, producing major coastal flooding in Kiribati, which caused significant damage to the island nation's coastal infrastructure.

== See also ==
- Weather of 2016
- Tropical cyclones in 2016
- List of Category 2 Pacific hurricanes
- List of off-season Pacific hurricanes
- List of tropical cyclones near the Equator
- Hurricane Nina (1957) – A late-season Pacific hurricane that came close to striking Hawaii in December
