= List of storms named Paine =

The name Paine has been used for four tropical cyclones in the Eastern Pacific Ocean:

- Hurricane Paine (1986) – Category 2, brushed the southern Baja California peninsula before hitting Sonora; its remnants contributed to severe flooding in the South Central United States
- Hurricane Paine (1992) – Category 1, never neared land
- Hurricane Paine (2016) – Category 1, dissipated just west of the Baja California peninsula
- Tropical Storm Paine (2022) – weak tropical storm, dissipated in the open ocean
