= List of storms named Rick =

The name Rick has been used for six tropical cyclones worldwide.

In the Eastern Pacific:

- Hurricane Rick (1985), strong Category 4 hurricane, never a threat to land
- Hurricane Rick (1997), weak Category 2 hurricane, made landfall near Puerto Escondido, Oaxaca
- Hurricane Rick (2009), powerful Category 5 hurricane, the third-most intense Pacific hurricane on record, made landfall near Mazatlán, Sinaloa, as a tropical storm
- Tropical Storm Rick (2015), weak tropical storm, never threatened land
- Hurricane Rick (2021), strong Category 2 hurricane, made landfall near Lázaro Cárdenas, Michoacán

In the Western Pacific:

- Tropical Storm Rick (1996) (T9618, 22W), minimal storm that stayed away from land
