= Hurricane Pauline =

Category 4 Pacific hurricane in 1997

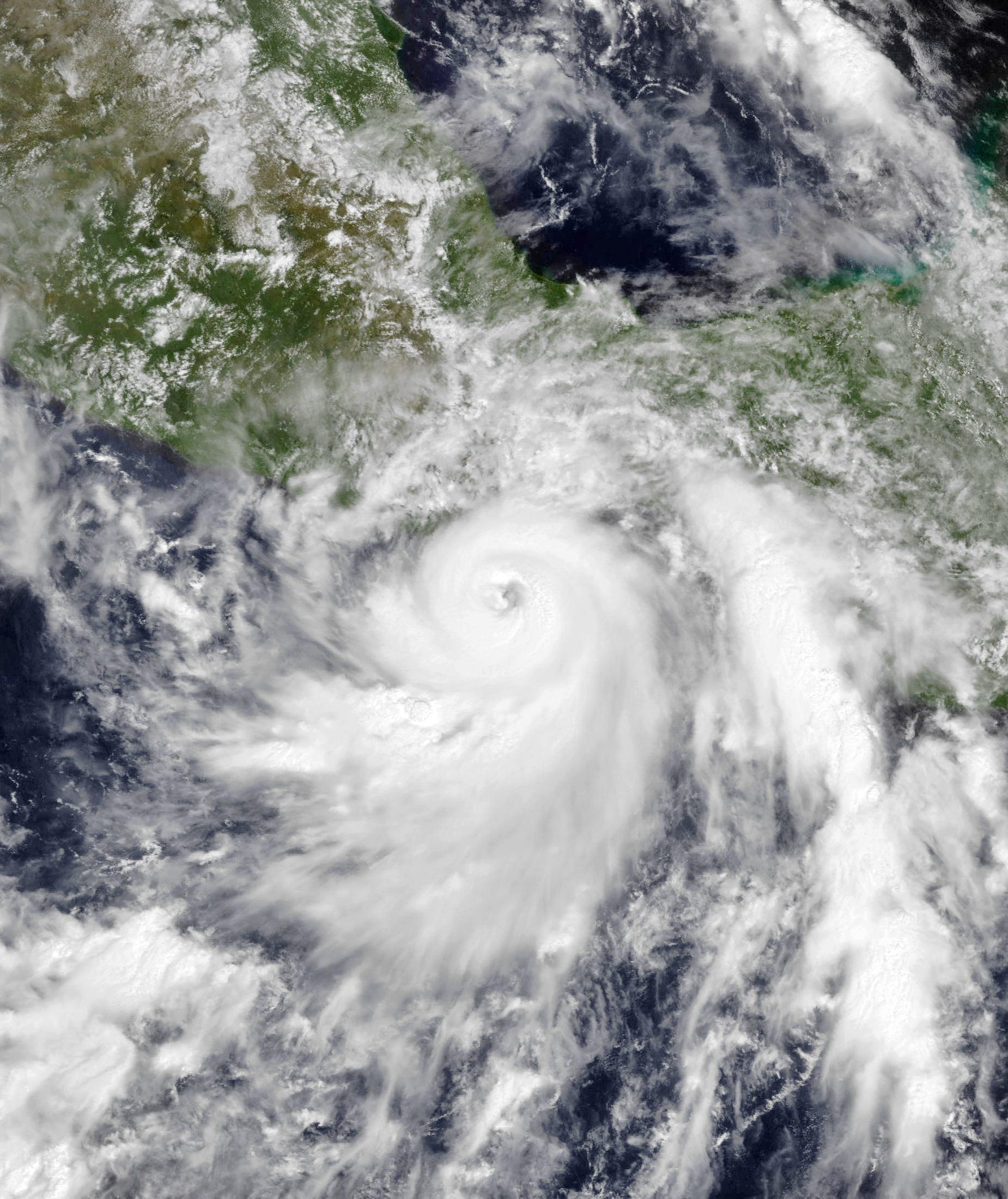
- Hurricane Pauline approaching Mexico at peak intensity on October 8

Meteorological history
- Formed: October 5, 1997
- Dissipated: October 10, 1997

Category 4 major hurricane
- 1-minute sustained (SSHWS/NWS)
- Highest winds: 130 mph (215 km/h)
- Lowest pressure: 948 mbar (hPa); 27.99 inHg

Overall effects
- Fatalities: 230–500 confirmed
- Damage: $448 million (1997 USD)
- Areas affected: Guerrero; Oaxaca
- IBTrACS
- Part of the 1997 Pacific hurricane season

Hurricane Pauline was one of the deadliest Pacific hurricanes to make landfall in Mexico. The seventeenth tropical storm, eighth hurricane, and seventh major hurricane of the 1997 Pacific hurricane season, Pauline developed out of a tropical wave from Africa on September 16, 1997, moving across South America and into the Pacific Ocean. On October 5, the depression intensified into a tropical storm early the next day and by October 7, Pauline had reached hurricane intensity. It initially moved eastward, then turned northwestward and quickly strengthened to reach peak winds of 135 mph (217 km/h). It paralleled the Mexican coastline a short distance offshore before weakening and making landfall near Puerto Ángel, Oaxaca, on October 9, and dissipated the next day.

Hurricane Pauline produced torrential rainfall along the Mexican coastline, peaking at 32.62 inches (829 mm) in Puente Jula. Intense flooding and mudslides in some of the poorest areas of Mexico killed between 230 and 500 people, making it one of the deadliest Eastern Pacific storms in recorded history. The passage of the hurricane destroyed or damaged tens of thousands of houses, leaving around 300,000 people homeless and causing $447.8 million in damage (1997 USD).

== Meteorological history ==
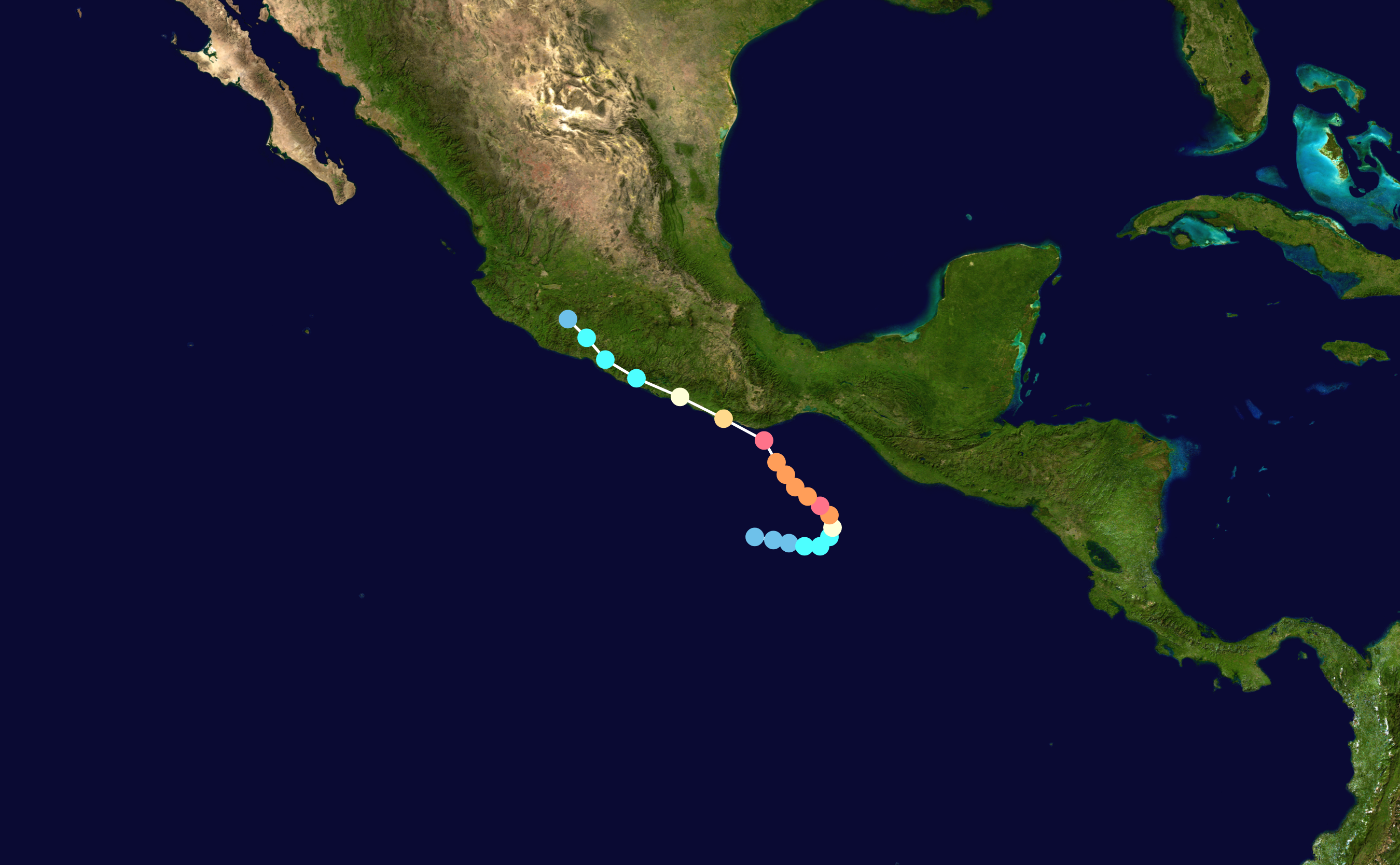
Map plotting the storm's track and intensity, according to the Saffir–Simpson scale Map key Saffir–Simpson scale Tropical depression (≤38 mph, ≤62 km/h) Tropical storm (39–73 mph, 63–118 km/h) Category 1 (74–95 mph, 119–153 km/h) Category 2 (96–110 mph, 154–177 km/h) Category 3 (111–129 mph, 178–208 km/h) Category 4 (130–156 mph, 209–251 km/h) Category 5 (≥157 mph, ≥252 km/h) Unknown Storm type Tropical cyclone Subtropical cyclone Extratropical cyclone, remnant low, tropical disturbance, or monsoon depression

The origins of Hurricane Pauline were thought to have been spawned by a tropical wave, which moved off the coast of Africa into the tropical Atlantic Ocean on September 16, 1997. The wave subsequently moved across the Atlantic Ocean and the Caribbean Sea, before it moved across northern South America and entered the Pacific Ocean near Panama on September 26. On October 5, after a low-level circulation centre and an area of deep atmospheric convection had persisted on visible satellite imagery, the United States National Hurricane Center (NHC) initiated advisories on the wave and designated it as Tropical Depression Eighteen-E. At this time the system was located about 290 mi (465 km) to the southeast of Puerto Ángel, Mexico, and had started to move eastwards, as a result of a trough of low pressure over central America that had disrupted the normal steering currents. During that day, the system continued to develop with a banding feature wrapping more than halfway around the low-level circulation center, before the system intensified into a tropical storm and was named Pauline by the NHC on October 6.

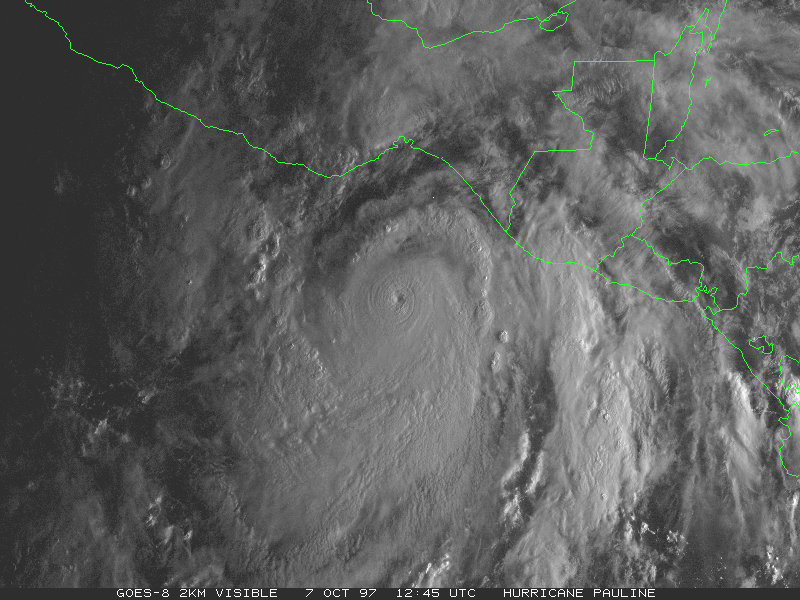
Hurricane Pauline at its initial peak intensity while off the Mexican coast on October 7

A strong high-pressure system eroded the trough over southeastern Mexico, which turned Pauline to the northeast. An eye feature developed late on October 6, and early on the next day Pauline intensified into a hurricane about 265 miles (426 km) southeast of Salina Cruz after turning to the north and northwest. Pauline rapidly intensified shortly after due to favorable conditions for continued development, and 18 hours after becoming a hurricane it attained a peak intensity of 130 mph (210 km/h). The winds of the hurricane weakened slightly to 115 mph (185 km/h), but on October 8 Pauline re-strengthened to reach winds of 130 mph (210 km/h) a short distance off the coast of Mexico. The hurricane turned more to the west-northwest while paralleling the southern coast of Oaxaca, and Pauline quickly weakened due to interaction with the mountainous terrain before landfall near Puerto Ángel as a 110 mph (180 km/h) hurricane early on October 9. The tropical cyclone continued to weaken as it paralleled the coast a short distance inland. On October 10, Pauline dissipated over Jalisco and no longer had a well-defined low-level circulation.

== Preparations ==
Early forecasts underestimated the peak intensity of Pauline by 65 mph (105 km/h). On October 7, about 41 hours before landfall, the government of Mexico issued a hurricane warning from Tapachula in Chiapas to Punta Maldonado in Guerrero. Shortly after Pauline made landfall, the warning was extended northwestward to Manzanillo, Colima, and later to Puerto Vallarta, Jalisco. Pauline's turn to the west-northwest near landfall was unexpected, resulting in hurricane conditions with only a few hours notice in some areas.

Authorities in El Salvador declared a national state of alert in response to the potential threat from the hurricane. Residents in flood-prone areas were warned of potential flash flooding. As the hurricane turned sharply to the northwest, there are no reports of damage or deaths from Pauline in the country. Officials in Puerto Madero closed port facilities to all ships, excluding ships in open seas seeking shelter. The government ultimately closed six major ports between Acapulco and Puerto Madero. State authorities in Oaxaca opened 75 emergency shelters and prepared 50 schools to house 10,000 people.

== Impact ==
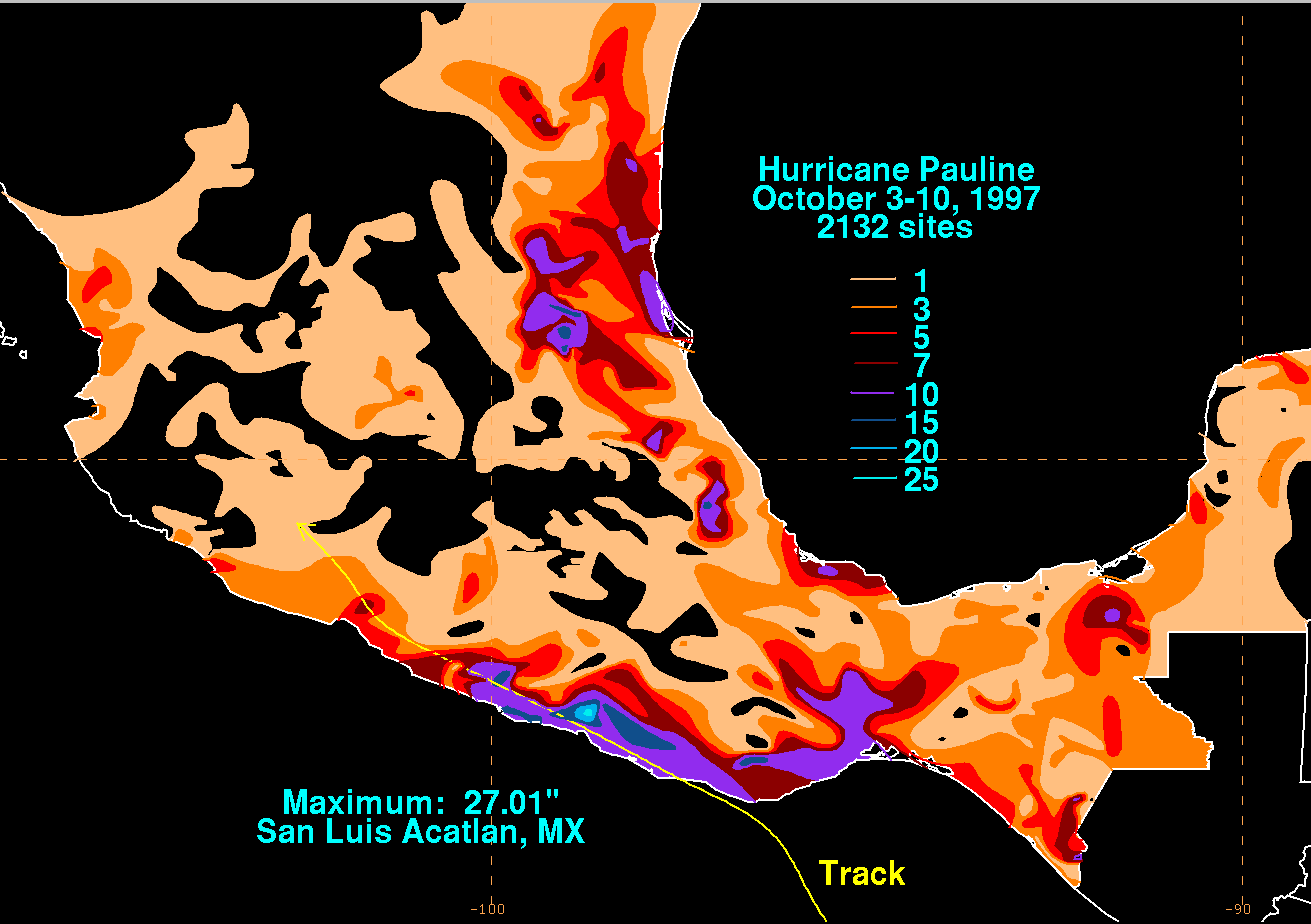
Total rainfall map for Hurricane Pauline in Mexico

Few surface observations were taken during the passage of the hurricane, though officials reported that southern Mexico experienced the brunt of the storm. Puerto Escondido, Oaxaca, near where Pauline made landfall, reported a peak wind gust of 70 mph (110 km/h) several hours before the hurricane moved through the area; no reports were available after that time. An anemometer in Acapulco reported a wind gust of 59 mph (95 km/h) with sustained winds of 46 mph (74 km/h). However, officials estimate Pauline might have been a hurricane while passing through the area. The hurricane produced very heavy rainfall along its path, with many areas receiving more than 15 inches (380 mm). According to the Comision Nacional del Agua, precipitation was recorded at 2,132 sites. The two highest reported rainfall totals are 27.1 inches (690 mm) at San Luis Actlan, and 32.62 inches (829 mm) at Puente Jula, near Paso de Ovejas in the state of Veracruz. This made Pauline the wettest tropical cyclone in the history of Guerrero until being surpassed by Hurricane John in 2024. In Acapulco, the hurricane dropped 16.9 in (430 mm) of rainfall in 24 hours. This broke the city precipitation record set originally in 1974; the 1997 total represented about 25% of the city's annual rainfall. Seas of about 30 ft (9.1 m) were reported along the Oaxaca coastline while the hurricane made landfall.

Hurricane Pauline lightly affected the state of Chiapas, but severely affected Oaxaca and Guerrero, two of the poorest regions of Mexico. The area most impacted was the region in and around Acapulco. Throughout the country, Hurricane Pauline resulted in $447.8 million in damage (1997 USD). A report issued by the United Nations Department of Humanitarian Affairs reported 137 deaths three days after Hurricane Pauline. Four days after the passage of the hurricane, a Reuters news report stated there were 173 dead with about 200 missing, while the government of Mexico issued a statement reporting 149 deaths. Ultimately, media reports indicated a death toll of at least 230 people, and the Mexican Red Cross estimated 400 dead and at least 1,900 missing. The Church World Service estimated at least 500 people were killed. Relief Web suggests that 217 fatalities were reported and 600,000 people were impacted. Approximately 300,000 people were left homeless due to the storm.

=== Environment ===
Known Pacific hurricanes that have killed at least 100 people
| Hurricane | Season | Fatalities | Ref. |
|---|---|---|---|
| "Mexico" | 1959 | 1,800 | |
| Paul | 1982 | 1,625 | |
| Liza | 1976 | 1,263 | |
| Tara | 1961 | 436 | |
| Pauline | 1997 | 230–400 | |
| Agatha | 2010 | 204 | |
| Manuel | 2013 | 169 | |
| Tico | 1983 | 141 | |
| Ismael | 1995 | 116 | |
| "Lower California" | 1931 | 110 | |
| "Mazatlán" | 1943 | 100 | |
| Lidia | 1981 | 100 | |

The hurricane caused severe damage to the environment; 200 square miles (520 km^{2}) of low-lying rainforest and pine and evergreen oak woodlands were greatly damaged in southern Mexico. Strong waves produced severe beach erosion in some locations. The erosion affected two nesting cycles for the olive ridley turtle, destroying about 40 million eggs. Nearly 806,000 nests were affected, and about 50% of these were wiped out. The deadliest and most intense hurricane to hit southern Mexico since 1959, the hurricane was the first documented hurricane strike on Pacific coral reefs. Crop damage was extreme, and 400,000 bags of coffee were lost. In the days after the hurricane, soybean and wheat prices increased. In all, Hurricane Pauline had a large effect on fauna in Southern Mexico.

=== Oaxaca ===
A state of emergency was declared for the state of Oaxaca shortly after Pauline made landfall. Abundant rainfall caused the River Los Perros to overflow its capacity, flooding 50 municipalities in Oaxaca. The flooding damaged 12 bridges, of which two were destroyed, and cut off some areas of electricity, drinking water, and telecommunications for several days. The passage of the hurricane affected thousands of houses, leaving roughly 250,000 homeless in the state. At least 110 people died in the state, with hundreds of thousands of residents and 1,278 communities being affected.

Strong winds from the hurricane downed trees and power lines throughout southern Oaxaca. The storm temporarily isolated Puerto Ángel and a navy base thereby cutting off communications from the rest of Mexico. In Huatulco, the winds blew down antennas at the local television station and destroyed at least 30 cardboard houses. A community near the airport of the city was hit hard, with several people left homeless. Heavy rainfall from the storm caused severe flooding in portions of Oaxaca and neighboring Chiapas. A total of about 500 entire communities were destroyed in Oaxaca; the areas worst affected were Zapotecos, Chatino, and Mixtecos.

=== Guerrero ===
Heavy rainfall led to severe mudslides and flooding throughout southern Guerrero. Entire communities were nearly destroyed, with some remaining flooded for a week after the hurricane. The flooding washed out or destroyed thousands of acres of crops, and killed thousands of cattle. The flooding and mudslides isolated more than 45,000 people from the outside world. The passage of the hurricane resulted in damage to houses, bridges, and electrical and water supply. About 400 mm (16 in) fell in the city in a three-hour span, resulting in rivers overflowing its banks. About 1,100 vessels were stranded at port, and 35 ships sunk. Damage to the coffee industry was $80 million (1997 USD). One environmental agency remarked that it will take 15 years for coffee crops to recover. According to one preliminary estimate, 123 people died in Guerrero, primarily in Acapulco. Over 200 were missing by four days after the hurricane due to being washed out to sea or buried in mudslides. A total of 50,000 people were left homeless across the state. Striking the week after Tropical Storm Olaf, previously wet grounds combined with heavy rainfall from Pauline resulted in severe mudslides and flash flooding in shanty towns around Acapulco Bay. There, around 5,000 homes were destroyed with another 25,000 damaged, with 10,000 people left homeless in and around the city. The luxury resort hotels near the beach were largely unaffected by the hurricane, though residents in the shanty towns lost what little they had. Much of the city was covered in mud, and 70 percent of Acapulco was without water as a result of the hurricane. Most of the city's one million residents were left without power or telephone service. Overall, total damage was nearly $300 million pesos.

== Aftermath ==
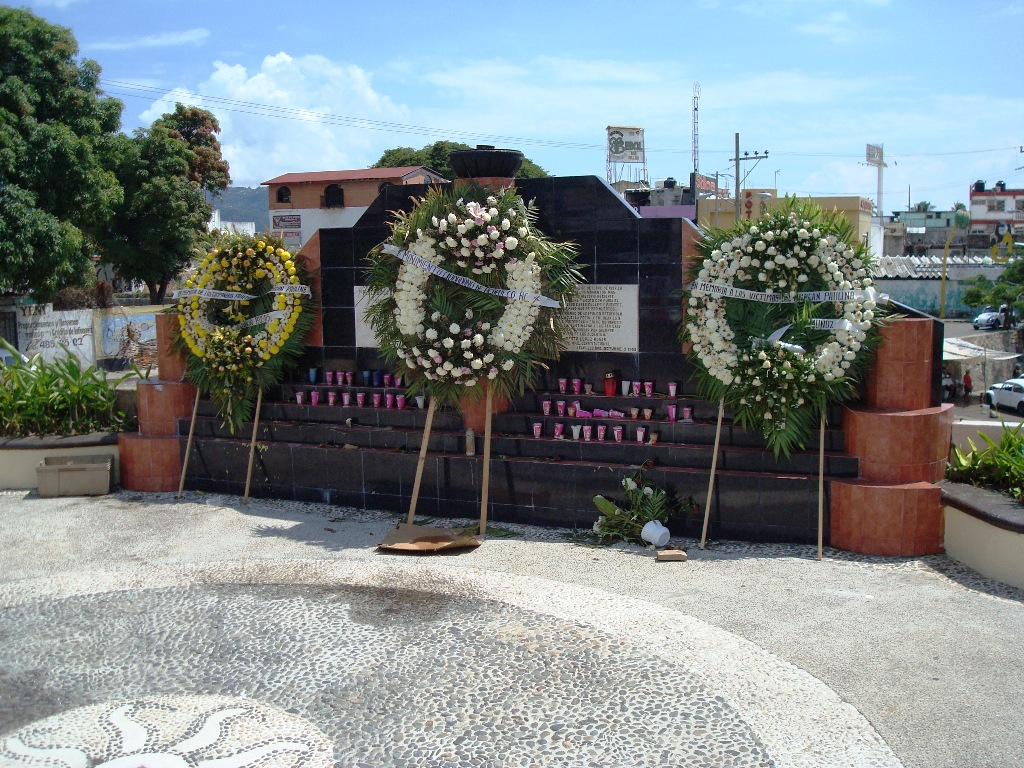
Memorial in Acapulco to honor the victims from Pauline

Volunteers from the Mexican Red Cross quickly went to disaster areas with search and rescue teams, including using specially trained dogs to search for hurricane victims trapped under muddy areas of Acapulco. By four days after the storm each team was finding one or two corpses per day, with officials stating the search could take weeks. In Guerrero, the teams rescued a total of 35 people from hazard. Hours after the hurricane passed through the area, relief works traveled by boat through flooded areas to assist the worst-hit areas. The Red Cross provided food, water, clothing, blankets, water purification supplies, milk powder and other non-perishable foods, and medical supplies to those staying in government shelters in Oaxaca, Guerrero, and Chiapas. The Mexican Red Cross also set up shelters to house and feed hundreds of displaced people, and by four days after the storm, the Red Cross distributed 100 tonnes of relief supplies to hurricane victims. Medical workers were also deployed to the area to aid the injured.

Officials set up emergency water purification plants in Acapulco, though water remained largely unavailable. Water trucks were sent to the city, with thousands standing in line for fresh water. Tourists in luxury hotels of Acapulco, for the most part generally unaffected by the hurricane, and rapidly recovered while other parts of the city remained devastated. Hotels were forced to use bottled water and ration their available water to as little as possible to provide water for the rest of the city. Extreme price gouging occurred in the city following the hurricane, with one consumer protection official reporting shopkeepers charging 200 percent more for milk, 500 percent more for tortillas, and 1000 percent more than usual for water. Even though the government was blamed for lack of warnings and water shortages, Ernesto Zedillo, the president of Mexico at that time, cut his vacation in Europe short to respond to the catastrophe. Government officials set up 39 aid centers for Acapulco citizens, though some residents were unable to get food and water. Some residents suspected than the president and his Institutional Revolutionary Party (PRI) of taking aid supplies for their own purposes. The president promised to seek charges and decided to close aid centers in favor of opening soup kitchens. Despite having the food, the Mexican army did not set up the kitchens, nor was aid distributed at the aid centers.

Most of Acapulco remained closed for at least a week after the hurricane. Initially, authorities around Acapulco gave preference to clean up tourist areas, which resulted in the scenic highway from the hotels to the airport being quickly fixed. Tourism greatly decreased following the hurricane, causing some hotels to charge 40 percent less than normal in an attempt to bring people back. One airline offered two plane tickets for the price of one from Mexico City to Acapulco. Most hotels were almost completely back to normal around a month after the hurricane.

=== Donations ===
The governments of Oaxaca and Guerrero asked UNICEF for assistance, specifically water tanks, water pumps, and construction material. International aid initially focused almost solely on the damage in Acapulco. By a week after the hurricane, 500 communities in Oaxaca remained isolated and without assistance, with several large communities in Guerrero not receiving any material aid by a week after the hurricane. The Adventist Development and Relief Agency organized about 7 tons of food and clothing, and sent a bus of 40 people to help isolated villages in southern Mexico. Around ten days after the hurricane struck, 20,000 people were still isolated from emergency crews and relief works, causing the president to suspect people could begin starving to death. Helicopters were initially sent to the remote areas, though severe fog and heavy rainfall after the hurricane grounded the operations. The government worked to bring food to remote mountain communities, though officials noted the serious risk in doing so.

Three days after the hurricane, the American Red Cross sent an initial donation of $25,000 (1997 USD), and also sent plastic sheets for temporary roofing and cleaning supplies such as mops, brooms, buckets, sponges, bleach, and cleaning chemicals. Local chapters also offered assistance. The chapter in San Antonio, Texas, sent cleaning kits, and the chapter in Los Angeles delivered 2,000 comfort kits containing hygiene supplies and crossword puzzles for children. The German Red Cross also offered assistance.

=== Diseases ===
The floodwaters from the hurricane combined with raw sewage in many poor areas of southwestern Mexico, leading to a widespread threat for a spread of tropical diseases. As a result, government health workers opened vaccination centers in several cities along the Guerrero and Oaxaca coasts. Thousands were inoculated for typhoid fever and tetanus. Officials noted a potential threat for dengue and cholera as a result of the spoiled water. Health workers also stated mosquitos possessing malaria and dengue fever were likely to breed in large areas of leftover water. In Acapulco, about two days after the hurricane passed, the first day of sun in a week evaporated the areas of leftover water, spreading dust across the region with the deadly diseases. Residents were warned to boil their food and water for 30 minutes due to the threat for contamination by the dust. At least twenty cases of cholera and at least six cases of dengue fever were reported. Most significantly, there were 14,630 cases of malaria in 616 villages in Oaxaca due to Pauline; this represented about 80% of the malaria cases in Mexico during 1998. Army soldiers distributed chlorine tablets to disinfect water pools and wheelbarrows to remove rotting mud and sewage from their damaged homes. Two C-130 Hercules planes and twenty helicopters airlifted food and water to smaller villages south of Acapulco that were stranded for nearly a week after the hurricane. Relief efforts in Oaxaca were hampered when Hurricane Rick brought over 10 in (250 mm) of additional rain to the region one month later, causing more flash flooding and mudslides.

=== Retirement ===
Because of the high death tolls and the extent of damage in Mexico, the name Pauline was retired following the season by the World Meteorological Organization and will never again be used for a Pacific hurricane. It was replaced by Patricia for the 2003 season.

== See also ==
- List of Pacific hurricanes
- List of retired Pacific hurricane names
- Timeline of the 1997 Pacific hurricane season
- List of Category 4 Pacific hurricanes
- Hurricane Otis (2023) – a catastrophic Category 5 hurricane that made landfall near Acapulco.
- Hurricane John (2024) – a powerful Category 3 hurricane that also caused catastrophic flooding in Acapulco.
- Hurricane Erick (2025) – a powerful Category 4 hurricane that was the earliest major hurricane to strike Mexico on record.
