= Hurricane Rick (1997) =

Category 2 Pacific hurricane in 1997

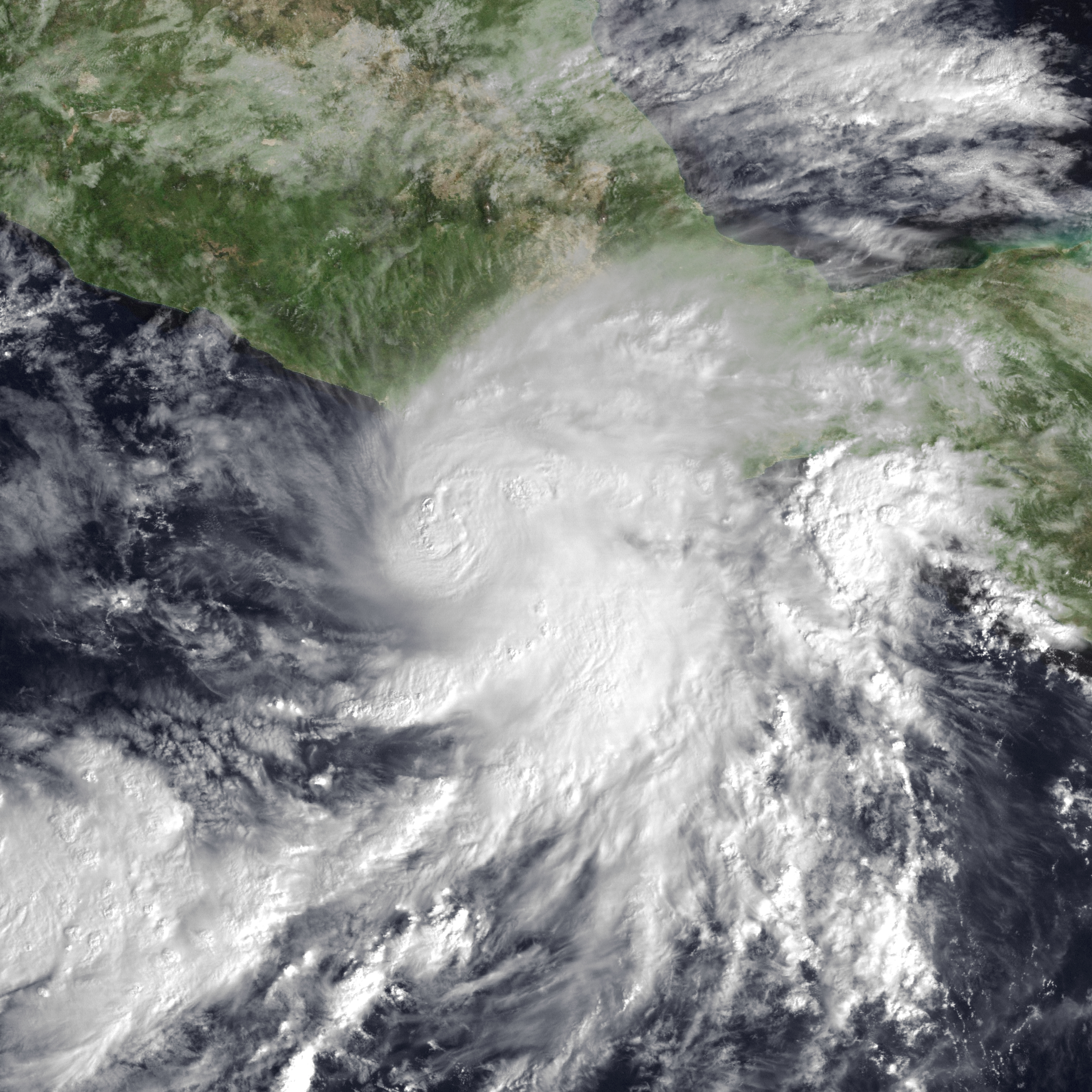
- Hurricane Rick at peak intensity off the coast of Mexico on November 9

Meteorological history
- Formed: November 7, 1997
- Dissipated: November 11, 1997

Category 2 hurricane
- 1-minute sustained (SSHWS/NWS)
- Highest winds: 100 mph (155 km/h)
- Lowest pressure: 973 mbar (hPa); 28.73 inHg

Overall effects
- Fatalities: None reported
- Damage: Minimal
- Areas affected: Mexico
- IBTrACS
- Part of the 1997 Pacific hurricane season

Hurricane Rick was the second-latest hurricane in the calendar year to make landfall in Mexico. The eighteenth named storm and ninth and final hurricane of the 1997 Pacific hurricane season, Rick was a short-lived Category 2 hurricane on the Saffir–Simpson hurricane scale that weakened before making landfall in Mexico on November 10. It hit almost a month after the more powerful Hurricane Pauline made landfall in the same area. Most of the damage associated with Pauline was exacerbated by the weaker Rick, which struck during rebuilding efforts.

Damage from Rick was fairly minor. As Rick was heading towards Mexico, the people on the coastline evacuated due to the impact of Pauline making them more prepared to deal with another hurricane, leading to no casualties.

== Meteorological history ==
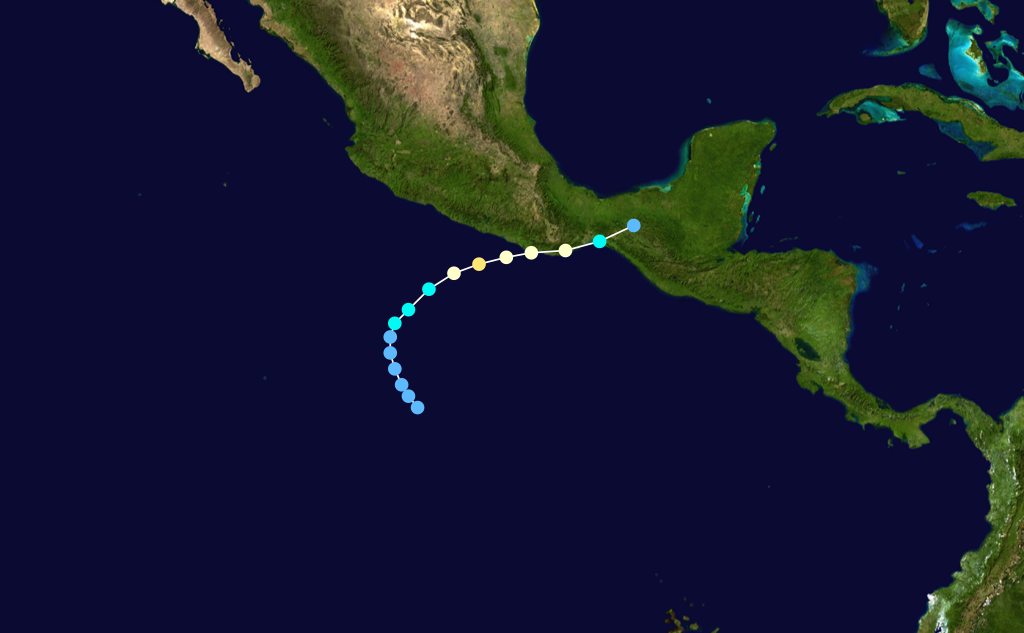
Map plotting the storm's track and intensity, according to the Saffir–Simpson scale Map key Saffir–Simpson scale Tropical depression (≤38 mph, ≤62 km/h) Tropical storm (39–73 mph, 63–118 km/h) Category 1 (74–95 mph, 119–153 km/h) Category 2 (96–110 mph, 154–177 km/h) Category 3 (111–129 mph, 178–208 km/h) Category 4 (130–156 mph, 209–251 km/h) Category 5 (≥157 mph, ≥252 km/h) Unknown Storm type Tropical cyclone Subtropical cyclone Extratropical cyclone, remnant low, tropical disturbance, or monsoon depression

Hurricane Rick's ultimate origin was a tropical wave that left Africa on October 15. While crossing the Atlantic, the wave was mainly tracked by continuity due to its lack or organization. After entering the Pacific, part of it developed cloudiness on November 5 when it was south of the Gulf of Tehuantepec. Organization and a circulation developed, and satellite tracking began on November 6. The disturbance became better organized and formed into Tropical Depression Nineteen-E on November 7.

At first moving northwest, the depression was turned north by a trough. Around noon on November 8, when it was about 375 miles (604 km) southwest of Acapulco, the depression was upgraded to Tropical Storm Rick. The storm developed a cold central dense overcast, turned northeast, and became a hurricane on November 9. An eye appeared that day, accompanied by a well-center visible on Acapulco radar. The hurricane reached its peak intensity of 100 mph (160 km/h) and 973 mbar, making it a low-end Category 2 on the Saffir–Simpson hurricane scale; However, some sources disagree, saying that Rick was a Category 3 major hurricane at its peak. After weakening to 85 mph (137 km/h), it made landfall on Oaxaca on November 10. Around the time of landfall, hurricane force winds extended 35 miles (56 km) and tropical storm force winds extended 115 miles (185 km) from the center, respectively. Rick continued to weaken while moving parallel to Mexico's coast along the Gulf of Tehuantepec before dissipating into a convectionless swirl of clouds over Chiapas on November 11.

== Preparations ==
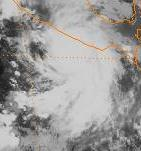
Hurricane Rick on November 9 near peak intensity.

The pre-Rick tropical depression was a threat to Mexico. Hours before upgrading, Mexican officials issued a tropical storm watch for the area between Lázaro Cárdenas, Michoacán, and Puerto Escondido, Oaxaca. Three hours before Rick was upgraded to a hurricane, the watch was upgraded to a warning and a hurricane watch was issued and shortly afterward raised to a warning. On November 9, the hurricane warning was extended to Zihuatanejo and Huatulco; warnings for areas west of Zihuatanejo and Lázaro Cárdenas were dropped at the same time. However, warnings for areas west of and including Acapulco remained until lifted three hours later. On November 10, warnings were extended from Punta Maldonado to Tapachula; all warnings west of Punta Maldonado were dropped at that time. Then, Mexico's Interior Ministry declared a state of emergency along the Oaxaca coast. Six hours later, the warnings were downgraded to tropical storm warnings. These warnings remained until they were dropped when Rick was downgraded to a depression.

The people in the coastal areas, most of which were already affected by the more catastrophic Pauline a month ago, were ready for Rick. All major ports along the coast were closed ahead of time in preparation, as well as airports in Huatulco and Puerto Escondido where power failures occurred because of Hurricane Rick. One hundred and thirty Red Cross workers, including twenty that were based in Mexico, who were in the area in the aftermath of Pauline, kept in the area to handle the second hurricane. Many people from Puerto Ángel, Huatulco, and Puerto Escondido (where National Operations Director Bernardino Heredia was overseeing recovery efforts) beach areas were evacuated. During the Puerto Ángel evacuation, helicopters landed carrying soldier and rifles, which one tourist likened to a third-world revolution. In Chiapas, officials watched for flooding along the rivers and upstream river valleys, where the rains from three previous systems caused the ground to saturate and in the state capital of Tuxtla Gutiérrez, families were evacuated due to rising rivers.

== Impact ==
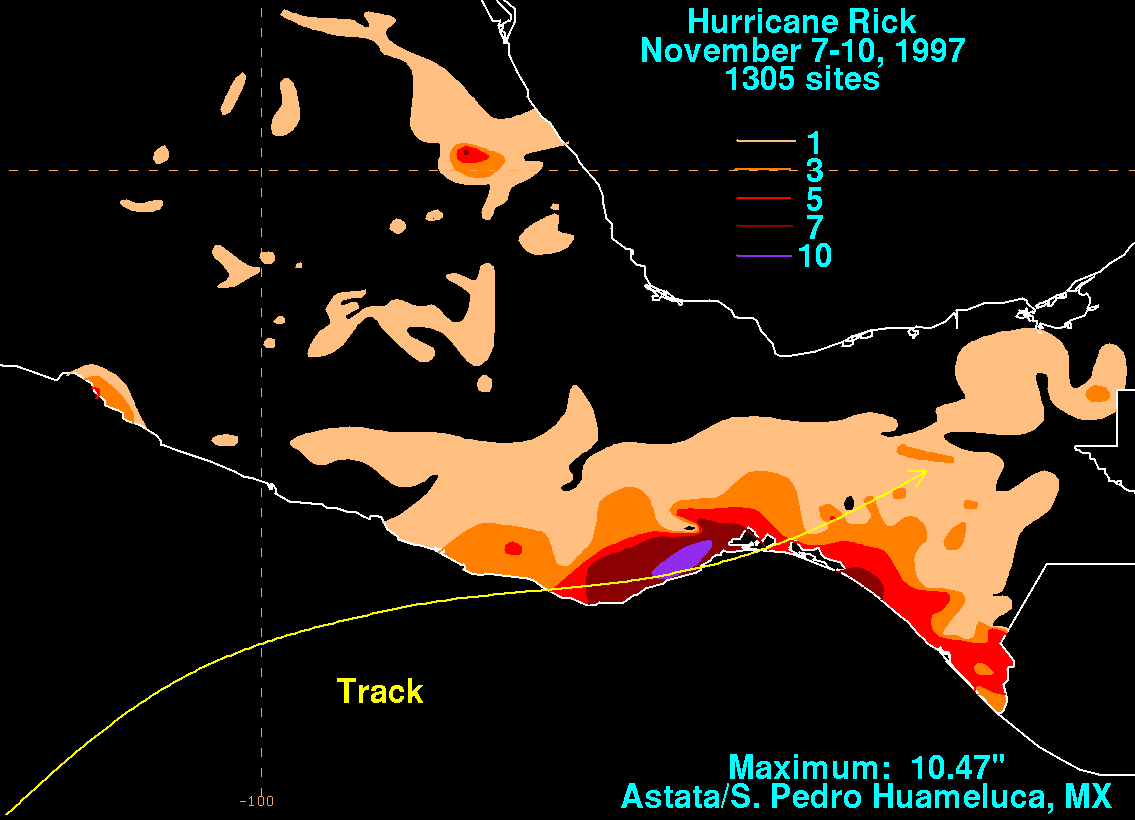
Rainfall map of the hurricane

The damage from Rick was minor in comparison to Pauline. In Oaxaca, the hurricane was responsible for dumping 10 inches (250 mm) of rain onto the state, which in turn resulted in mudslides and flash floods in areas earlier ravaged by Pauline. These rains also resulted in the sea level rising three feet above normal levels due to high waves generated during its passage. The hurricane was also responsible for rendering bridges and roads unpassable in the state, which had only recently been repaired after they were damaged by two prior hurricanes: 1995's Hurricane Roxanne in the Atlantic and Pauline, which had weakened bridges a month prior, allowing Rick to topple them, including a bridge near Puerto Escondido which left a 15-foot (4.6 m) deep gap in the road. Among the major roads that were cut off were a mountain road from Puerto Angel to Oaxaca City, a route used to link the coast with Mexico City, and a route from Puerto Escondido with Acapulco. A total of 10.47 inches (266 mm) of rainfall, the highest total caused by Rick, was recorded in Astata/San Pedro Huameluca, which was near the point where the hurricane made landfall. Telephone communications and traffic were cut off to many villages in the wake of the hurricane.

Although Rick was much weaker than Pauline, there were some areas where Rick's impact was greater than that of Pauline's. One such place was the village of El Tomatal, located 10 miles (16 km) southeast of Puerto Escondido. There, eight houses were destroyed and roofs were torn off of many others, which residents attributed to more rain than in Pauline, even though the winds were roughly equal. Although there were no casualties, the hurricane caused more than 2,000 people to become homeless. Most of what Pauline had left behind was destroyed by Rick, which one resident said was like "Pauline came to harvest the corn, and Rick came to harvest the peanuts."

In the United States, Rick had a temporary economic impact when, during its time off the shore of Chiapas and Oaxaca, it caused the price of coffee to rise 4.7 percent to $1.5685 per pound on the Coffee, Sugar and Cocoa Exchange in New York, the highest total it reached since October 16. Mexico is the United States's largest source of coffee imports and Oaxaca and Chiapas are the largest coffee growing regions in Mexico. Like the impact in El Tomatal, Rick's effects were much worse than Pauline's because Rick threatened the coffee crop when the beans were more susceptible to winds that could blow them off.

== Records ==
Rick was one of only eight known hurricanes to form in the East Pacific in November. The others were Nina in 1957, Tara in 1961, Iwa in 1982, Nora in 1991, Sergio in 2006, Kenneth in 2011, and Sandra in 2015. Rick was the second one of these to make landfall, although it was the third weakest of them, just slightly stronger than Nina and Iwa (Tara's central pressure is unknown). Rick is also the second-latest hurricane in official records to have hit either coast of Mexico, behind only Tara.

== See also ==
- List of Pacific hurricane records
- Timeline of the 1997 Pacific hurricane season
- Hurricane Pauline
- 1997 Pacific hurricane season
- Other storms with the same name
