= Andres =

Andres or Andrés may refer to:

- Andres, Illinois, an unincorporated community in Will County, Illinois, US
- Andres, Pas-de-Calais, a commune in Pas-de-Calais, France
- Andres (name)
- Hurricane Andres
- "Andres" (song), a 1994 song by L7
- Andre's, a defunct Michelin-starred restaurant in Las Vegas

== See also ==
- San Andrés (disambiguation), various places with the Spanish name of Saint Andrew
- Anders (disambiguation)
- Andre (disambiguation)
- Andreas (disambiguation)
