= List of storms named Andres =

The name Andres has been used for eight tropical cyclones in the Eastern Pacific Ocean:

- Hurricane Andres (1979), Category 2 hurricane that made landfall in Mexico as a tropical depression.
- Tropical Storm Andres (1985), formed near the Mexican coast but moved out to sea.
- Tropical Storm Andres (1991), stayed well clear of land.
- Tropical Storm Andres (1997), formed near Central America and made landfall in San Salvador.
- Tropical Storm Andres (2003), remained in mid-ocean.
- Hurricane Andres (2009), Category 1 hurricane that tracked parallel to the southwestern coast of Mexico.
- Hurricane Andres (2015), Category 4 hurricane that remained in the open ocean and never affected land.
- Tropical Storm Andres (2021), remained over the open ocean.
