= 1997 Pacific hurricane season =

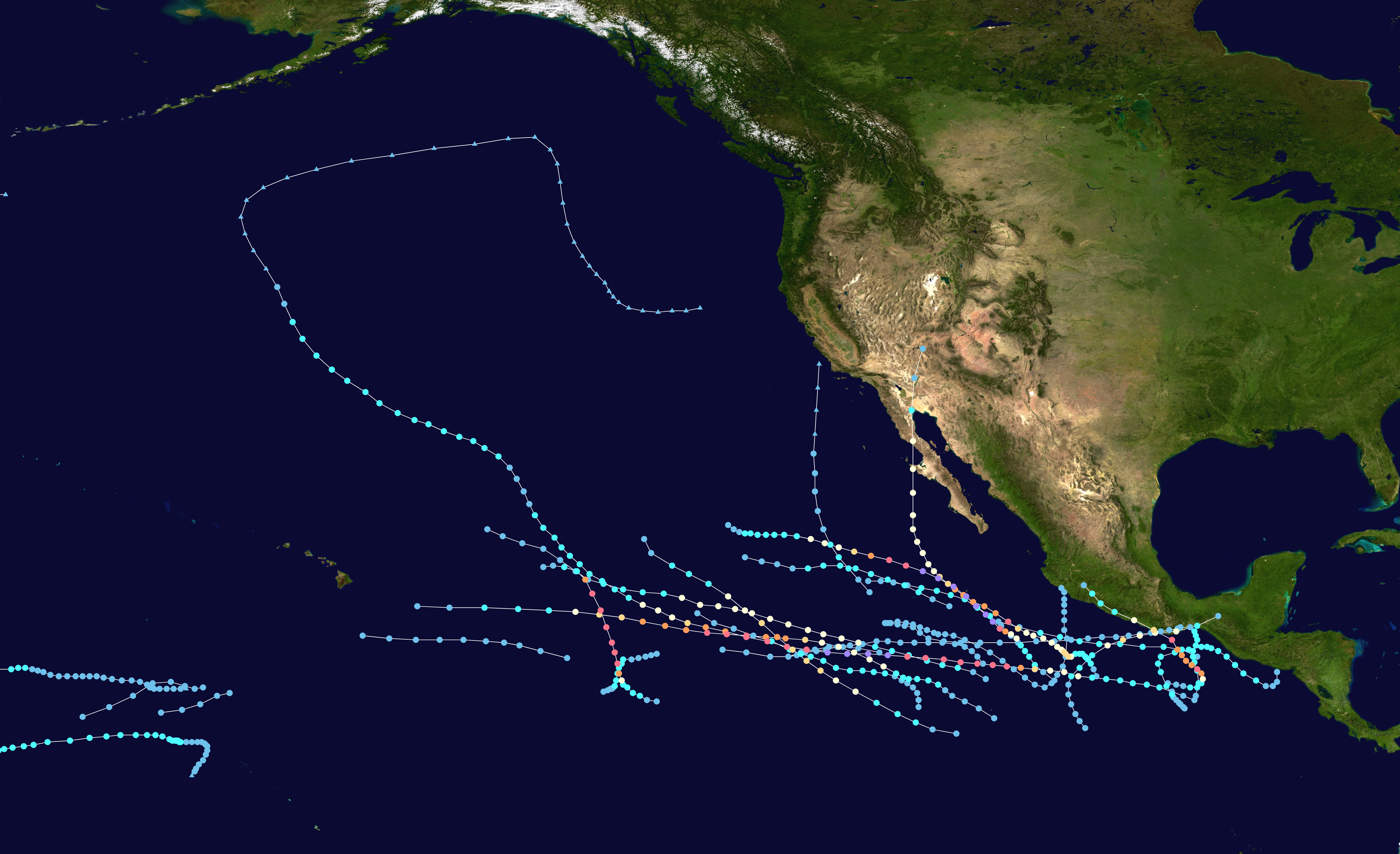
- Season summary map

Seasonal boundaries
- First system formed: June 1, 1997
- Last system dissipated: December 6, 1997 (Note: The last storm, Paka, did not dissipate on December 6. It crossed into the Western Pacific, and because it was the final storm of the season, the crossover date is listed on here as the dissipation date. December 23.)

Strongest storm
- Name: Linda (Third-most intense hurricane in the Pacific basin)
  - Maximum winds: 185 mph (295 km/h) (1-minute sustained)
  - Lowest pressure: 902 mbar (hPa; 26.64 inHg)

Seasonal statistics
- Total depressions: 24
- Total storms: 19
- Hurricanes: 9
- Major hurricanes (Cat. 3+): 7
- ACE: 167.5
- Total fatalities: 261–531 total
- Total damage: $551 million (1997 USD)

Related articles
- Timeline of the 1997 Pacific hurricane season; 1997 Atlantic hurricane season; 1997 Pacific typhoon season; 1997 North Indian Ocean cyclone season

The 1997 Pacific hurricane season was a very active hurricane season. With hundreds of deaths and hundreds of millions of dollars in damage, this was one of the deadliest and costliest Pacific hurricane seasons on record. This was due to the exceptionally strong 1997–98 El Niño event. The season officially started on May 15, in the eastern Pacific, and on June 1, in the central Pacific, and lasted until November 30. These dates conventionally delimit the period of each year when almost all tropical cyclones form in the northeastern Pacific Ocean.

Several storms impacted land. The first was Tropical Storm Andres which killed four people and left another two missing. In August, Tropical Storm Ignacio took an unusual path through the basin, resulting in its extratropical remnants causing minimal damage throughout the Pacific Northwest and California. Linda became the most intense east Pacific hurricane in recorded history, a record it maintained until it was surpassed by Hurricane Patricia in 2015. Although it never made landfall, it produced large surf in Southern California and as a result, five people had to be rescued. Hurricane Nora caused flooding and damage in the Southwestern United States, while Olaf made two landfalls and caused eighteen deaths and several other people were reported missing. Hurricane Pauline killed several hundred people and caused record damage in southeastern Mexico. In addition, Super Typhoons Oliwa and Paka originated in the region before crossing the International Date Line and causing significant damage in the western Pacific. There were also two Category 5 hurricanes: Linda and Guillermo.

Activity in the season was above average. The season produced 17 named storms, which was a little above normal. The average number of named storms per year is 15. The 1997 season also had 9 hurricanes, compared to the average of 8. There were also 7 major hurricanes compared to the average of 4.

== Season summary ==
The 1997 Pacific hurricane season officially started on May 15, 1997, in the Eastern Pacific, and on June 1, 1997, in the Central Pacific, and lasted until November 30, 1997. These dates conventionally delimit the period of each year when most tropical cyclones form in the northeastern Pacific Ocean. The first storm, Andres, formed on June 1. The last storm, Paka, crossed the International Date Line into the Northwestern Pacific Basin on December 6.

The 1997 Pacific hurricane season was fairly active, due to the strong El Niño that was occurring at the time. El Niño causes wind shear to be reduced and water temperatures to increase, resulting in conditions more conductive for tropical cyclones in the East Pacific. There were 24 tropical cyclones in total, including five unnamed tropical depressions. Of the 19 remaining tropical cyclones that became tropical storms, nine reached hurricane status (excluding Tropical Storms Oliwa and Paka, which attained typhoon status after crossing into the Western Pacific basin). Also, seven of the nine hurricanes reached Category 3 intensity or higher on the Saffir–Simpson hurricane scale, becoming major hurricanes.

Activity in the Central Pacific was also above average. Two tropical storms formed, as did three tropical depressions. Four tropical cyclones also moved in from the Eastern Pacific. Overall, nine tropical cyclones entered or formed in the Central Pacific in 1997, the fourth-highest number since accurate records began in 1961.

The National Hurricane Center uses accumulated cyclone energy (ACE) to rank hurricane seasons as above-normal, near-normal, and below-normal. The total ACE of this season overall is 167.9 units, which qualifies this season as above-normal.

== Systems ==
=== Tropical Storm Andres ===
- Tropical storm (SSHWS)
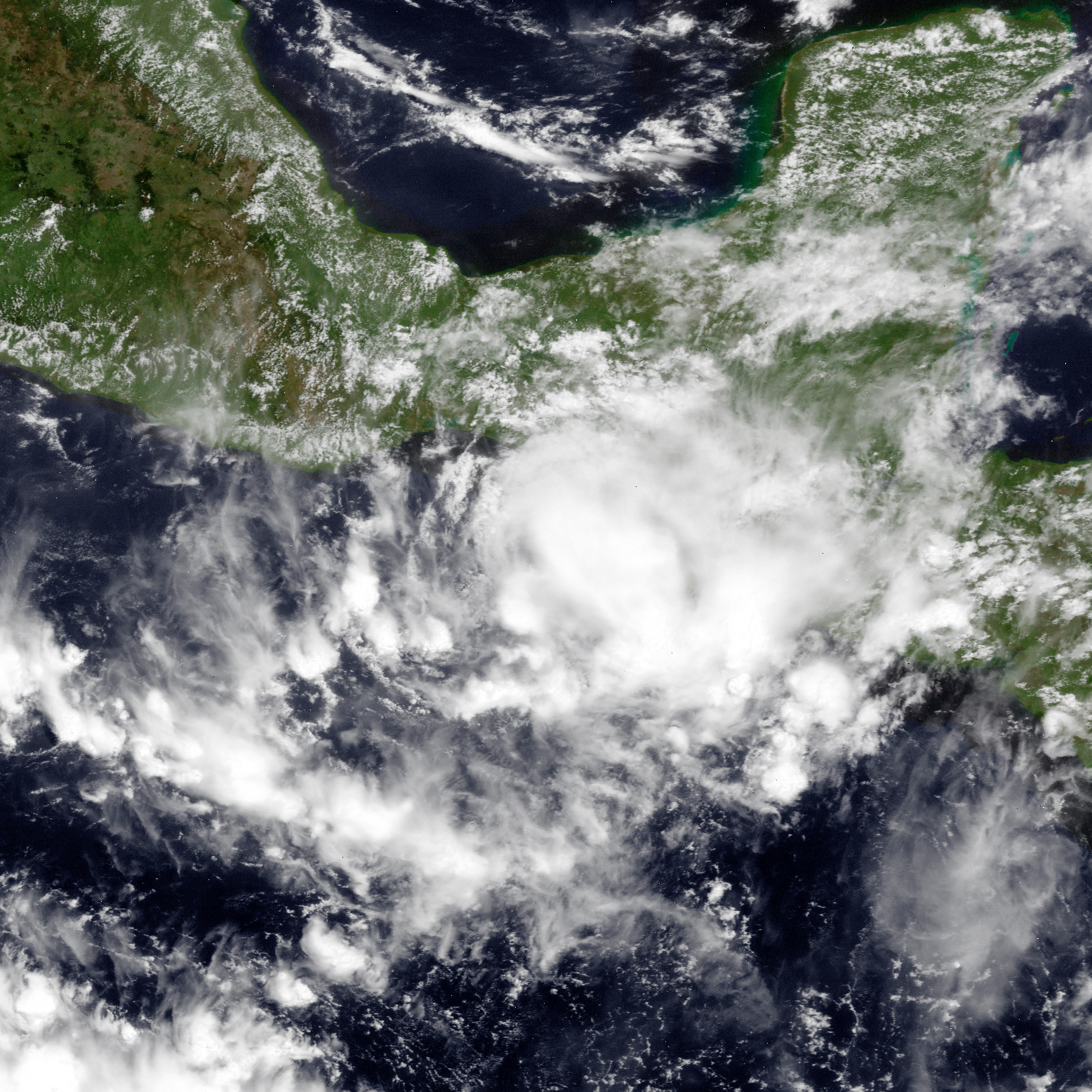
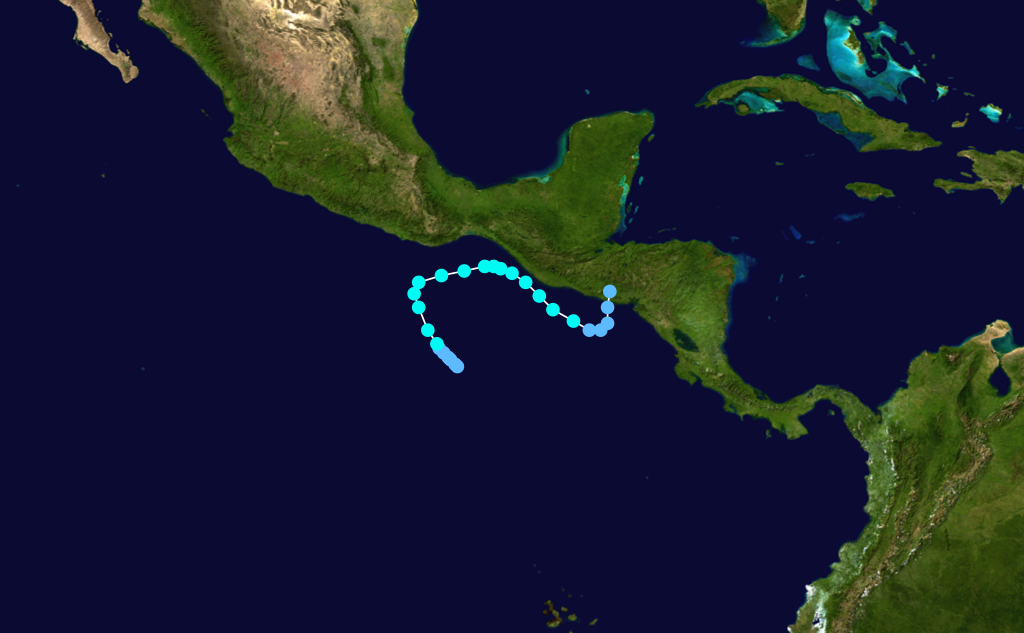
- Duration: June 1 – June 7
- Peak intensity: 50 mph (85 km/h) (1-min); 998 mbar (hPa)

Toward the end of May 1997, a low-level circulation formed off the southern coast of Central America, possibly from a tropical wave that previously traversed the Atlantic Ocean. An area of convection, or thuderstorms, formed on May 31. It organized into Tropical Depression One-E early on June 1, about 345 miles (555 km) south of the Gulf of Tehuantepec. After its formation, another circulation developed and became the dominant center. On June 2, the depression intensified into Tropical Storm Andres. On the next day, a trough bypassed the storm to the north, which turned Andres to the southeast. The NHC described the track as "unprecedented". Andres passed about 35 miles (56 km) off the coast of Guatemala, before it began weakening due to interaction with the Intertropical Convergence Zone. The convection became amorphous and later shifted to the southeast of the circulation. On June 6 Andres weakened to tropical depression status. It turned northward and moved ashore near San Salvador, El Salvador on June 7, which was the first recorded landfall in the country. The low-level circulation quickly dissipated over land, although the mid-level circulation persisted across Central America. After the featured reached the western Caribbean Sea, a new surface circulation developed, bringing rainfall to Cuba, Florida, and the Bahamas before it was absorbed by a weak trough in the Gulf of Mexico.

The storm prompted tropical storm warnings issued from Punta Galera, Mexico to Champerico, Guatemala, and a tropical storm watch for Guatemala and El Salvador. Officials closed ports along the southern Mexican coastline. Andres produced rainfall along the coast of Mexico, in Guerrero, Oaxaca, and Chiapas, as well as through the Yucatán Peninsula. The highest total in the country was 11.42 inches (29.0 cm) in Mazatán, Chiapas. Heavy rainfall and high seas spread across western Central America. In El Salvador and Nicaragua, the storm led to power outages, traffic accidents, and overflown rivers, as well as destroyed bridges and buildings in Nicaragua. Two fishermen were left missing in Nicaragua, and the storm damaged 91 houses and destroyed 82 more, leaving a total of 1,259 people homeless. There were 4 deaths in El Salvador in Usulután, due to flooding.

=== Tropical Storm Blanca ===
- Tropical storm (SSHWS)
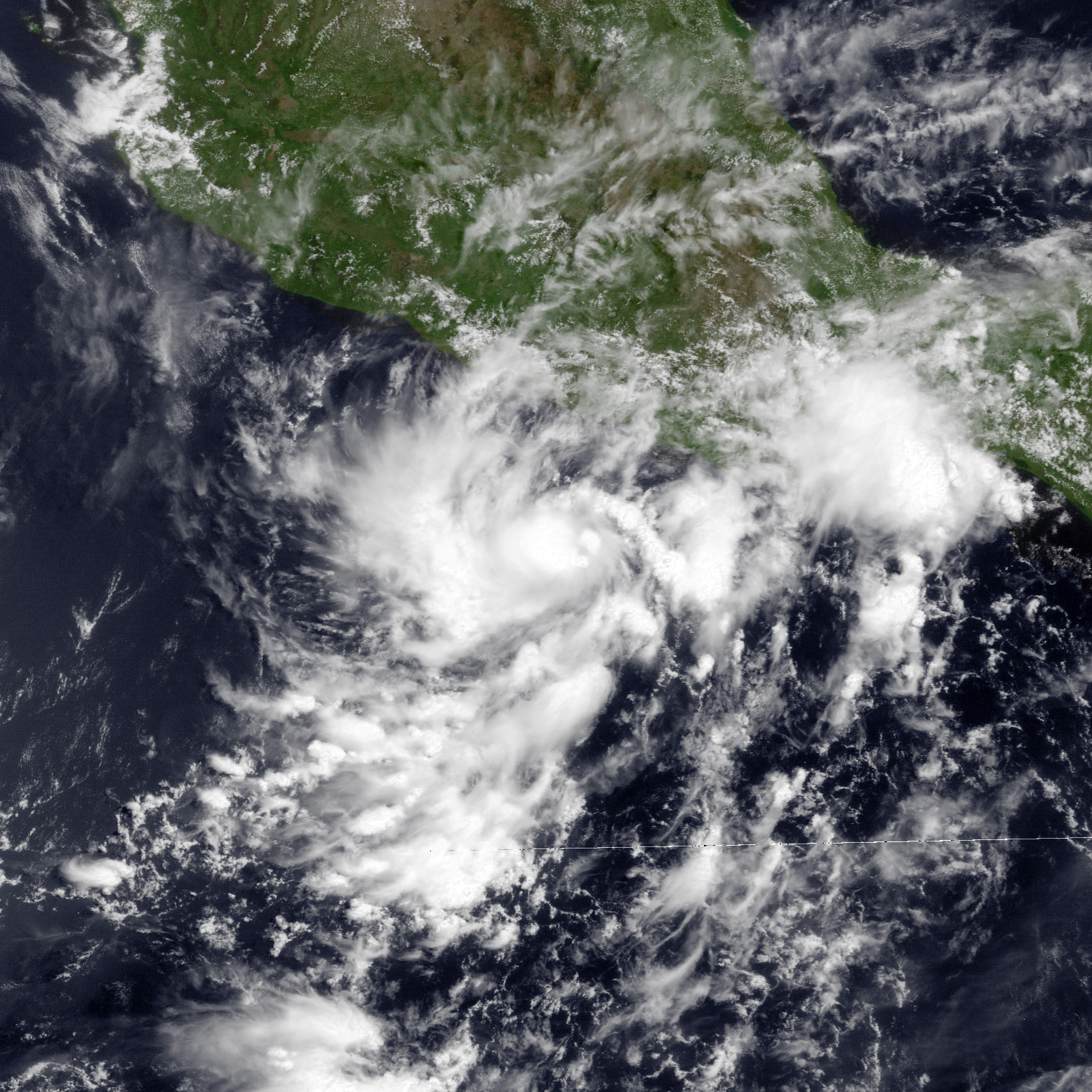
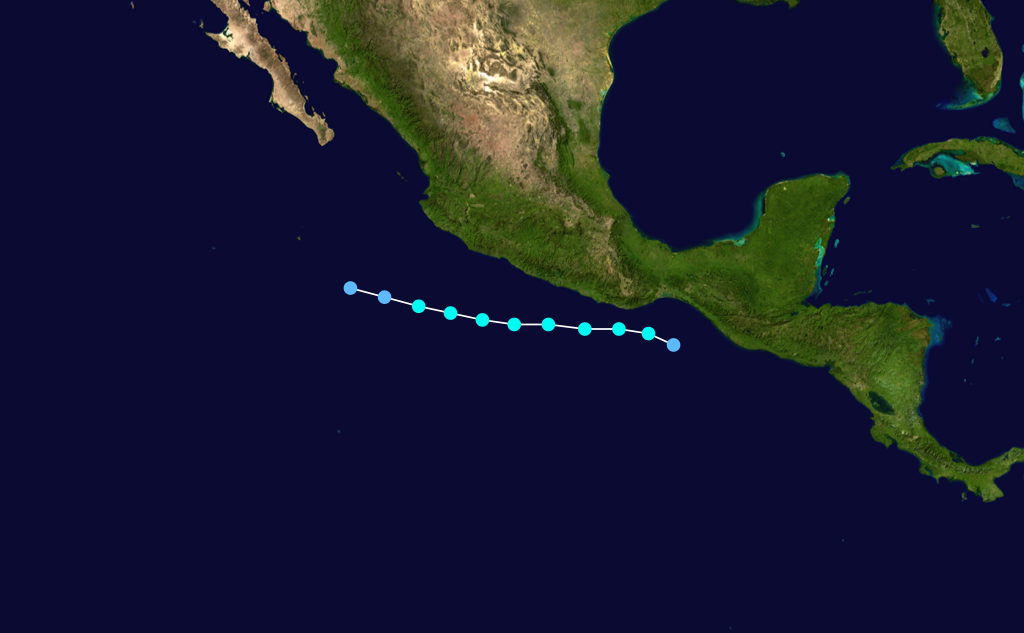
- Duration: June 9 – June 12
- Peak intensity: 45 mph (75 km/h) (1-min); 1002 mbar (hPa)

Tropical Depression Two-E formed from a broad area of low pressure on June 9. Six hours later the depression strengthened into Tropical Storm Blanca. This system developed a good outflow, and reached its peak intensity with winds of 45 mph (75 km/h). However, its circulation was not well-defined and a weakening trend began, and Blanca was downgraded to a depression on June 12. It lost its closed circulation shortly thereafter and was thus declared dissipated.

Blanca briefly threatened land on June 10 as warnings and watches were established by the Mexican Servicio Meteorológico Nacional. Shortly thereafter, a ridge of high pressure turned Blanca away from the coast. As Blanca moved just south of the Mexican coast, it dropped a total of 5.77 inches (147 mm) of rainfall at Fincha Chayabe/Maragaritas.

=== Tropical Storm Carlos ===
- Tropical storm (SSHWS)
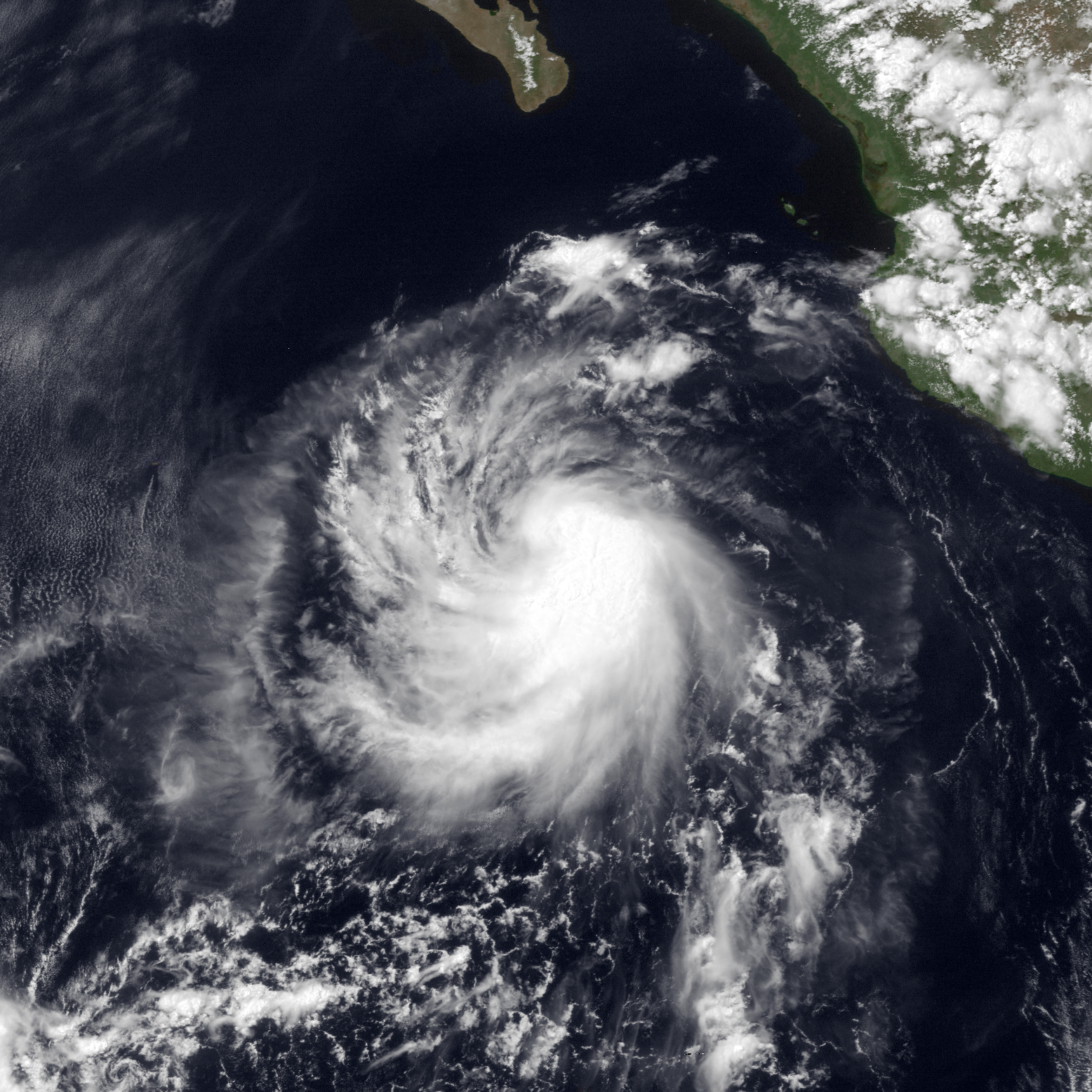
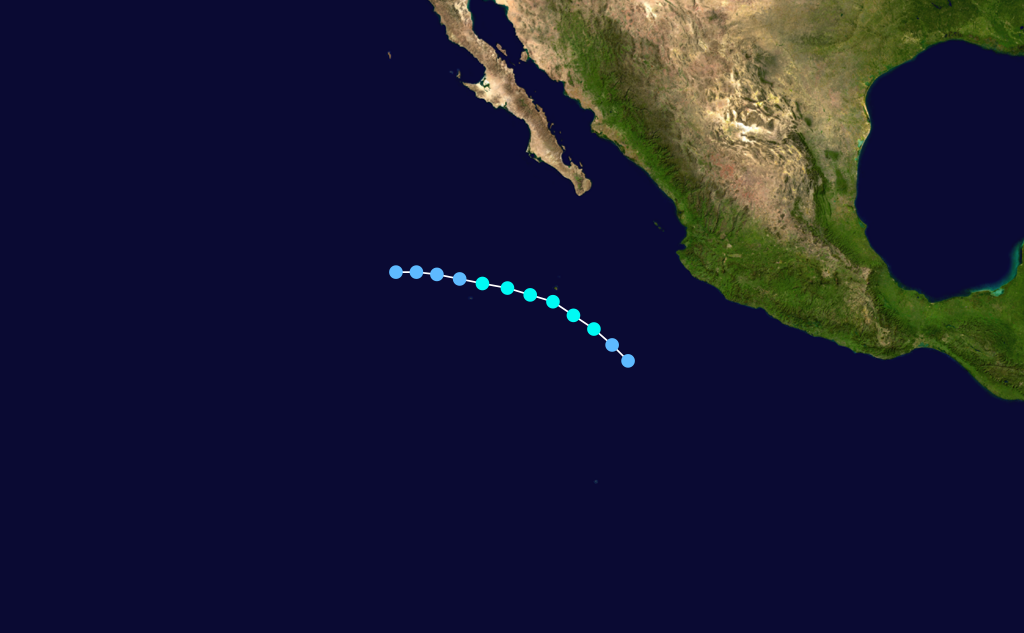
- Duration: June 25 – June 28
- Peak intensity: 50 mph (85 km/h) (1-min); 996 mbar (hPa)

On June 22, showers increased associated with a tropical wave several hundred miles away from land. Three days later, deep convection became more concentrated, and the system became a tropical depression. It intensified into Tropical Storm Carlos as banding features increased and the outflow became better defined. As it moved west, convection diminished as Carlos moved into cooler water. Shortly thereafter, increased wind shear took its toll on Carlos as the low-level center became exposed from the deep convection. Carlos weakened into a depression early on June 27, and dissipated June 28. However, a swirl of clouds remained for a couple of days. Except for Socorro Island, which the system passed close to, Carlos never threatened land.

=== Hurricane Dolores ===
- Category 1 hurricane (SSHWS)
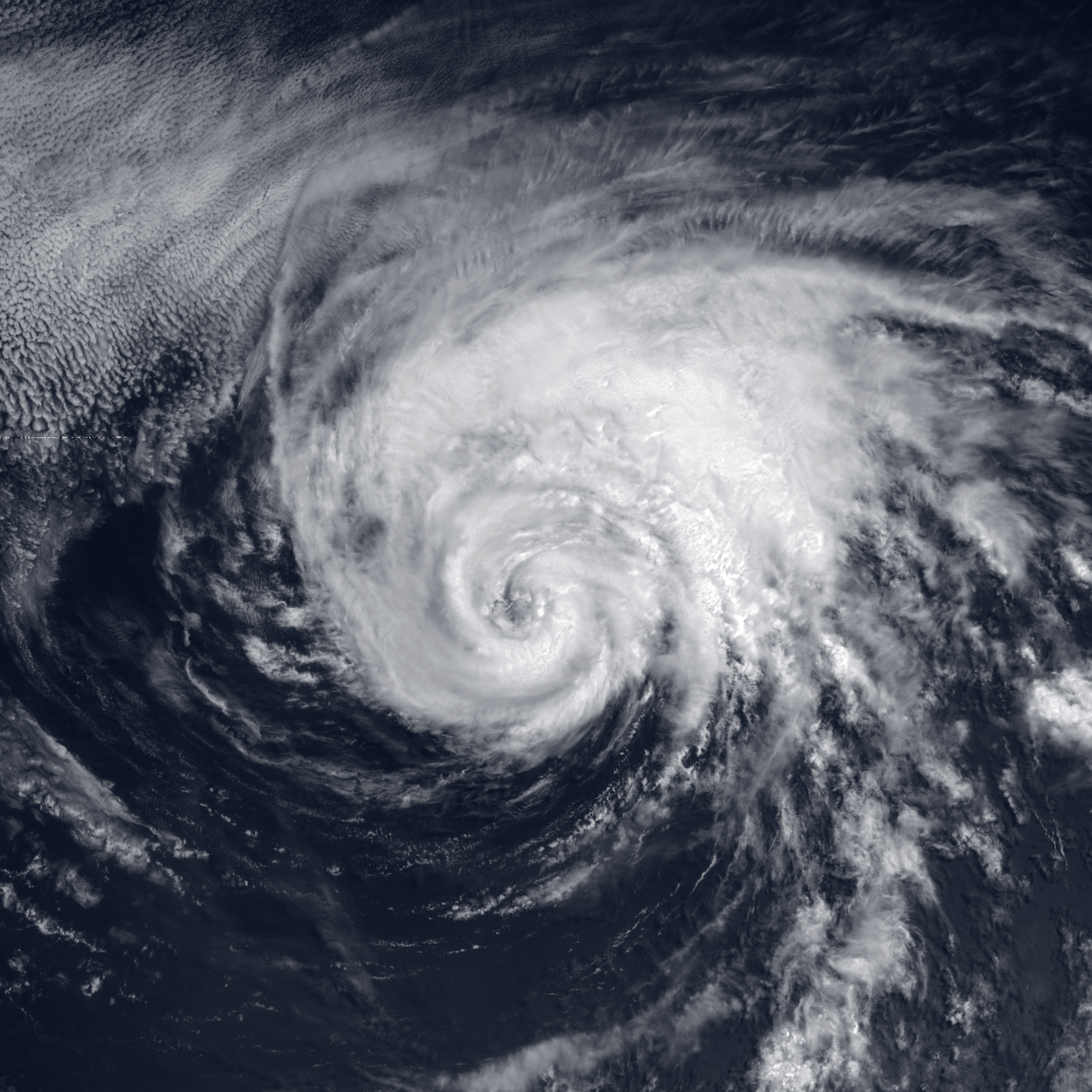
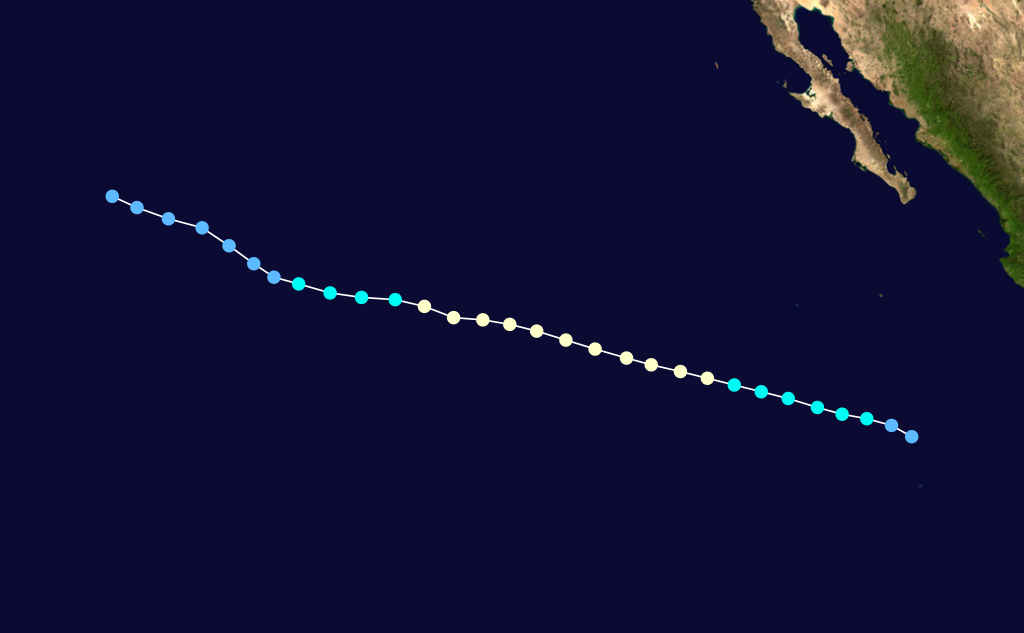
- Duration: July 5 – July 12
- Peak intensity: 90 mph (150 km/h) (1-min); 975 mbar (hPa)

In early July, shower activity increased in association with an area of disturbed weather. With surface pressures lower than normal for a tropical disturbance, deep convection increased further and Tropical Depression Six-E formed late on July 5 and reaching tropical storm status the following day and was named Dolores. Despite moderate wind shear, very cold cloud tops formed as the winds increased to 60 mph (95 km/h), a moderate tropical storm. Moving westward, Dolores strengthened into the first hurricane of the season on July 7 as a ragged eye formed.

Dolores continued to intensify and it reached a peak windspeed of 90 mph (150 km/h), a strong Category 1 hurricane, two days later. Meanwhile, Dolores became the first hurricane in over two years to cross longitude 125°W. Shortly thereafter, the hurricane started losing strength as it moved over cooler waters. The eye dissipated from satellite imagery while the associated thunderstorm activity became sheared. Dolores weakened back into a tropical storm on July 10 and a tropical depression the next day. The cyclone then crossed into the Central Pacific Hurricane Center's area of responsibility (west of longitude 140°W) while producing minimal shower activity. It dissipated on July 12.

=== Hurricane Enrique ===
- Category 3 hurricane (SSHWS)
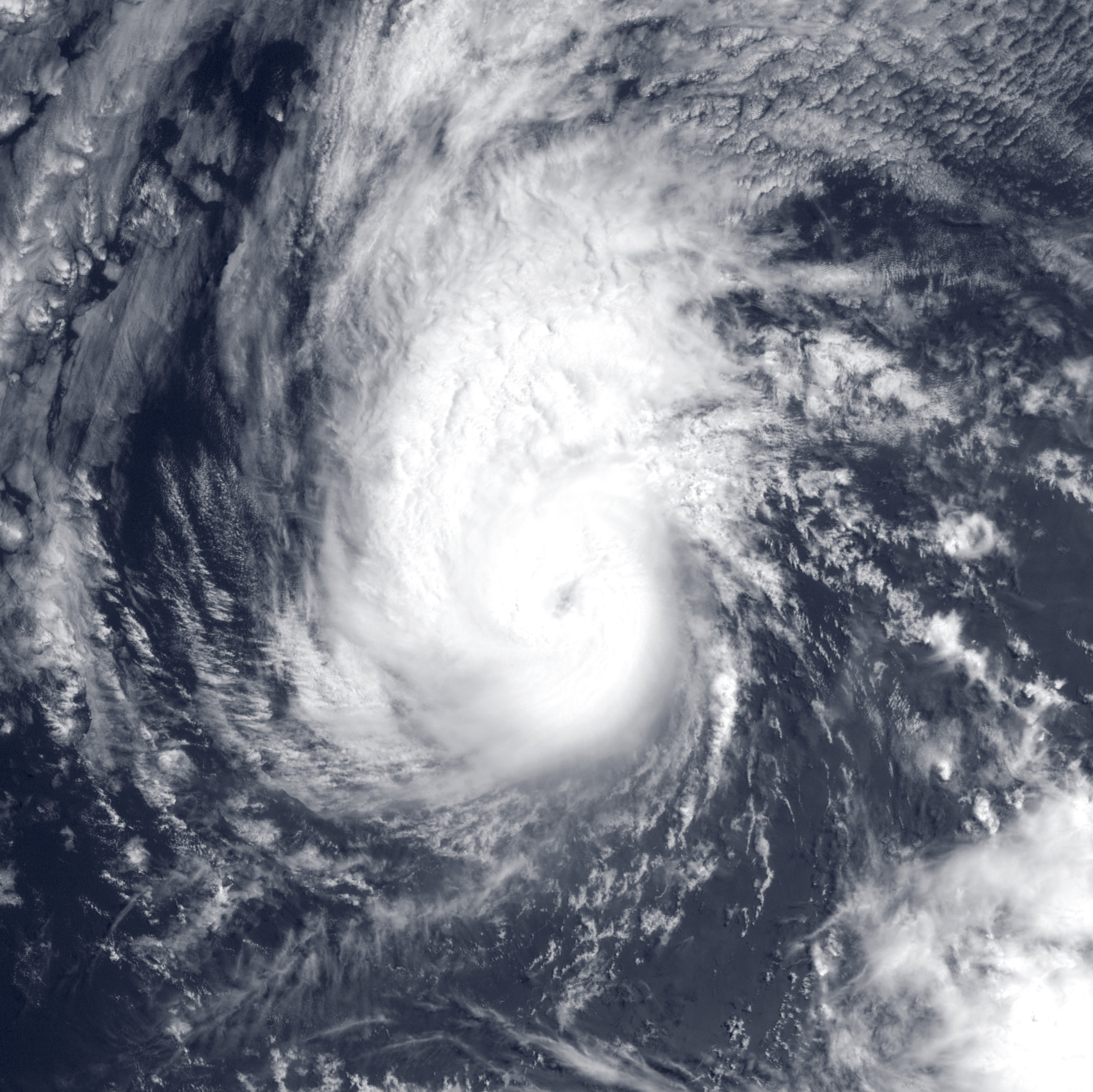
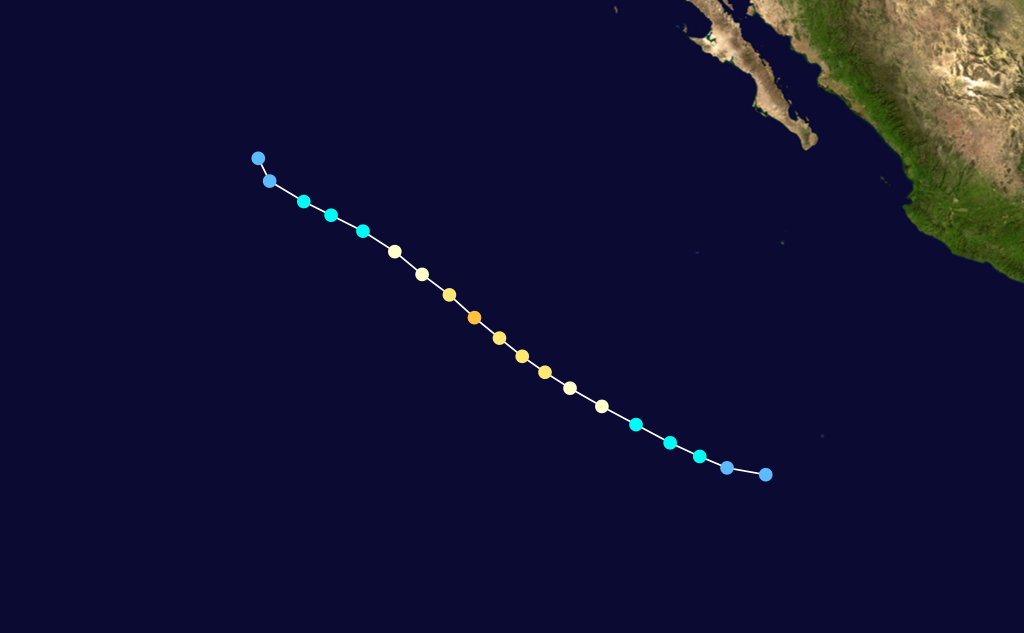
- Duration: July 12 – July 16
- Peak intensity: 115 mph (185 km/h) (1-min); 960 mbar (hPa)

The first major hurricane of the season originated from a broad area of low pressure on July 8 near the Gulf of Tehuantepec. The thunderstorms gradually became more concentrated and a tropical depression formed on July 12. It strengthened into a tropical storm twelve hours later, and then began to rapidly intensify as convection increased further near the center. It became a hurricane on July 13. Enrique continued to steadily intensify and became a Category 2 hurricane on July 14. The next day, Enrique reached its peak intensity of 115 mph (185 km/h) and peak pressure 960 mbar (hPa) on July 14. Shortly thereafter, the hurricane outflow became asymmetrical and it began to weaken over cool waters. It weakened fairly quickly and was downgraded into a Category 2 hurricane on July 15. It then lost hurricane intensity later that day. On July 16 the winds had decreased further to 50 mph (80 km/h). Enrique weakened into a depression the next day, and degenerated into a swirl of clouds shortly thereafter.

=== Hurricane Felicia ===
- Category 4 hurricane (SSHWS)
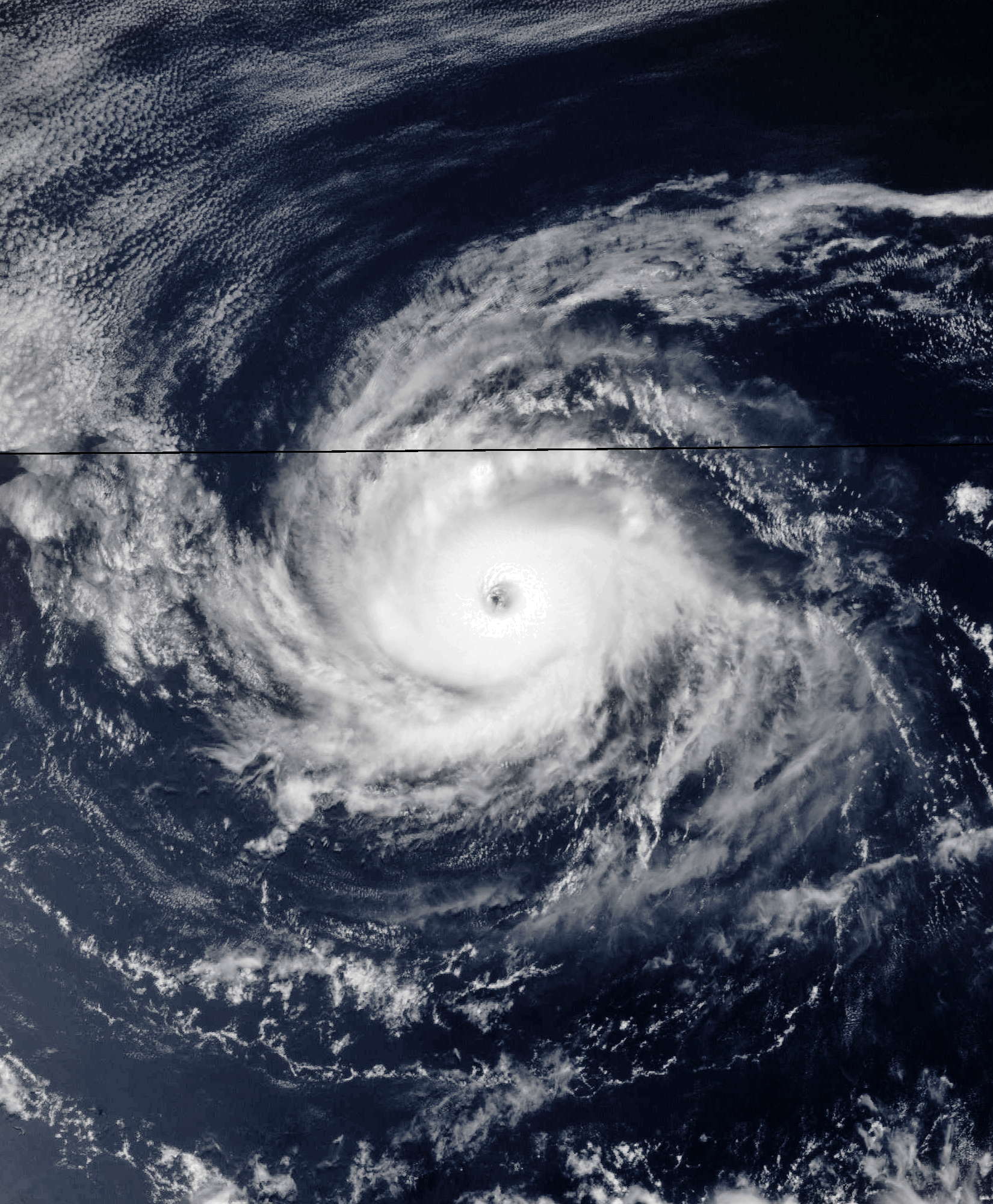
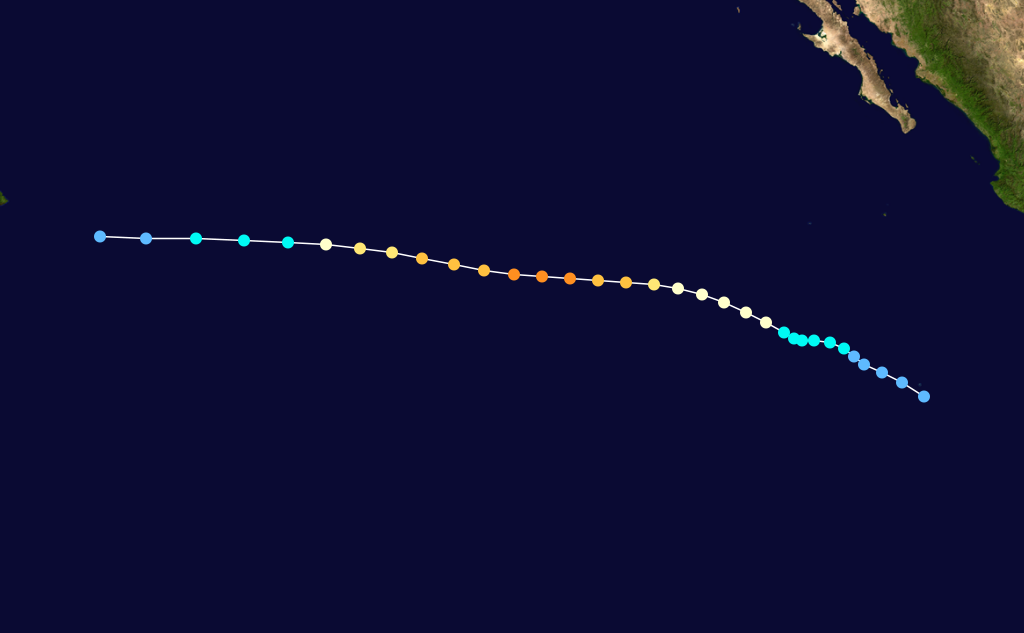
- Duration: July 14 – July 22
- Peak intensity: 130 mph (215 km/h) (1-min); 948 mbar (hPa)

A large area of disturbed weather formed on July 13. It then organized into a depression south of Manzanillo, Colima, on July 14. Intensification was delayed by wind shear due to its proximity to Enrique for about two days. However, it became a tropical storm late July 15 as it moved west-northwestward. Continuing to intensify, an eye formed. Based on this, Felicia was upgraded into a hurricane on July 17. Its development was again halted by increased wind shear, and as such it leveled off in intensity. After the shear decreased, Felicia began to intensify and the hurricane's winds reached 215 km/h (130 mph) and its pressure fell to 948 mbar (hPa), making it a moderate low-end Category 4 hurricane. Shear increased for the third time, and then moved into cooler waters. It began to weaken as it moved west-northwest. On July 20, it lost major hurricane intensity. Shortly before being downgraded to a tropical storm, it crossed 140°W. A strong wind shear took toll on Felicia and it was downgraded into a tropical depression July 22.

=== Hurricane Guillermo ===
- Category 5 hurricane (SSHWS)
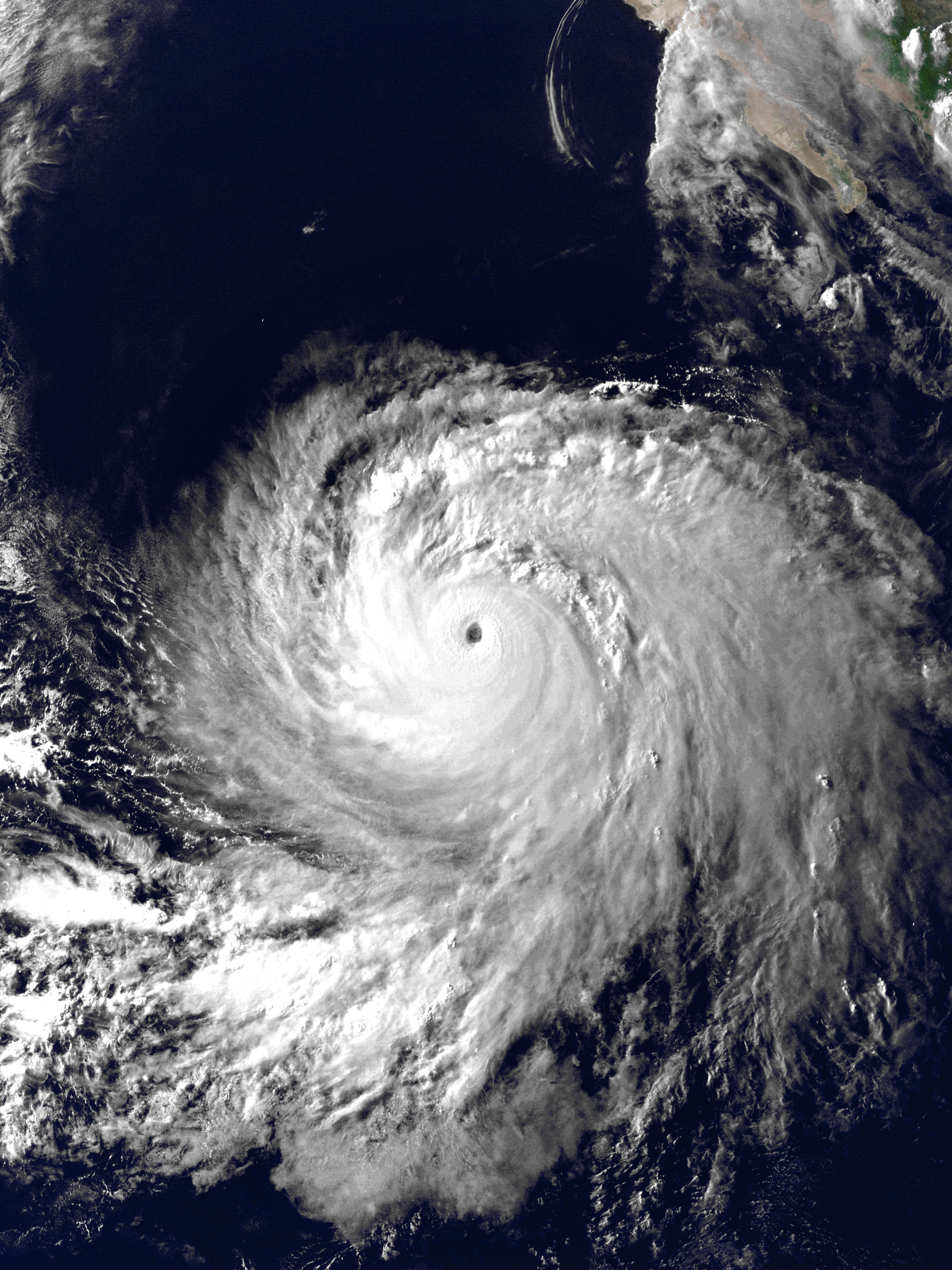
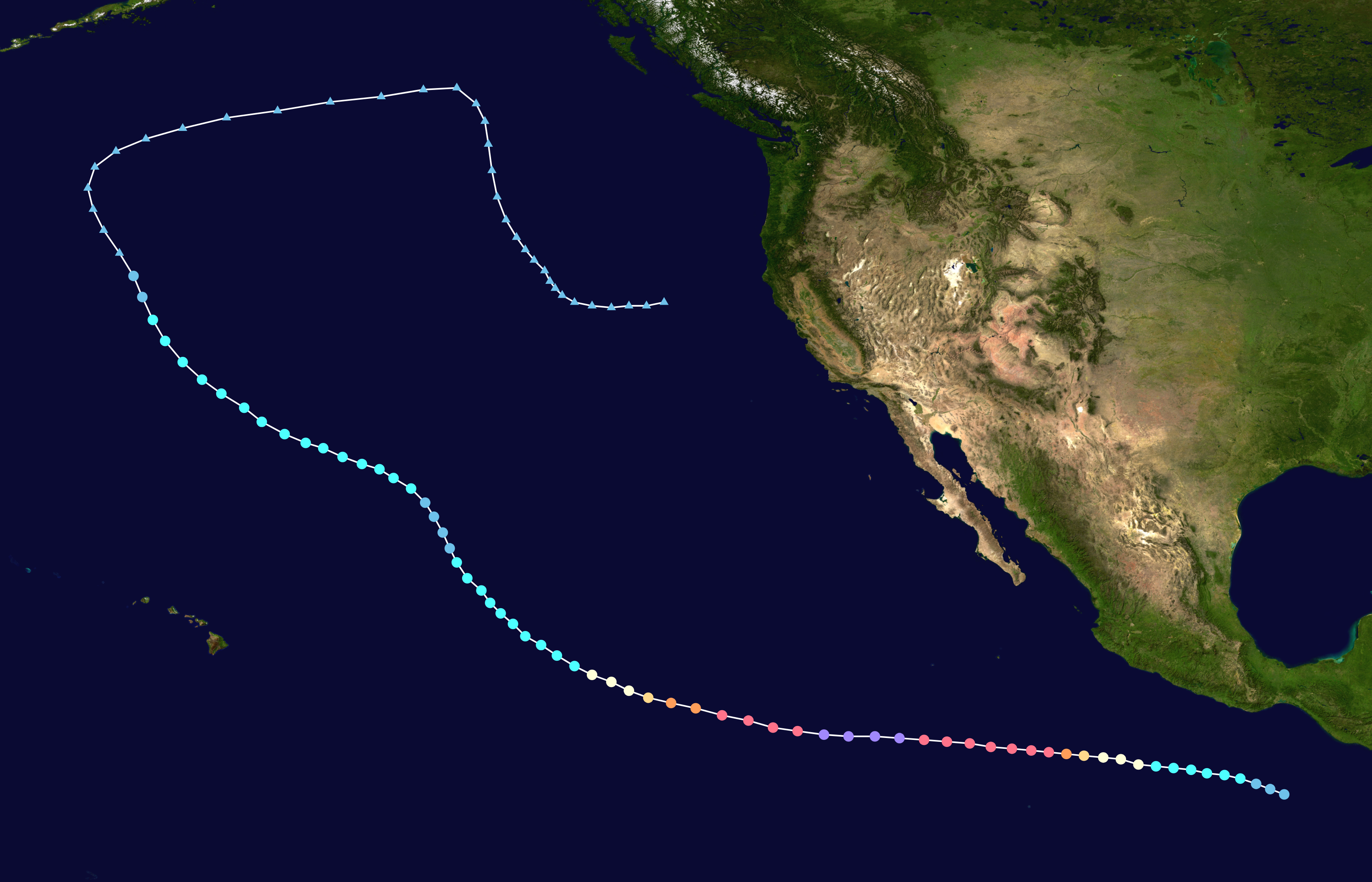
- Duration: July 30 – August 15
- Peak intensity: 160 mph (260 km/h) (1-min); 919 mbar (hPa)

A tropical wave emerged into the Pacific Ocean on July 27. It organized into a depression July 30 and was named Tropical Storm Guillermo the next day. It quickly intensified, reaching hurricane status on August 1. Guillermo became a major hurricane on August 2. It reached Category 4 intensity on August 3. Continuing to rapidly intensify, Guillermo attained Category 5 strength August 4. It reached its peak intensity the next day, with 919 mbar (hPa) minimum central pressure and 160 mph (260 km/h) maximum sustained winds.

Guillermo then weakened slowly, becoming a tropical storm August 8. It crossed 140°W and entered the Central Pacific. It weakened to a depression late August 10, but restrengthened back into a storm 24 hours later when it encountered a small area of warmer water. It weakened to a depression for the second and final time August 15 and became an extratropical cyclone early the next day. The storm's remnants recurved over the far northern Pacific. They were tracked to a point 500 nautical miles (930 km) west of Vancouver Island. The remnants persisted for a few more days and drifted south before being absorbed by a mid-latitude cyclone August 24 off the coast of California.

=== Tropical Storm Hilda ===
- Tropical storm (SSHWS)
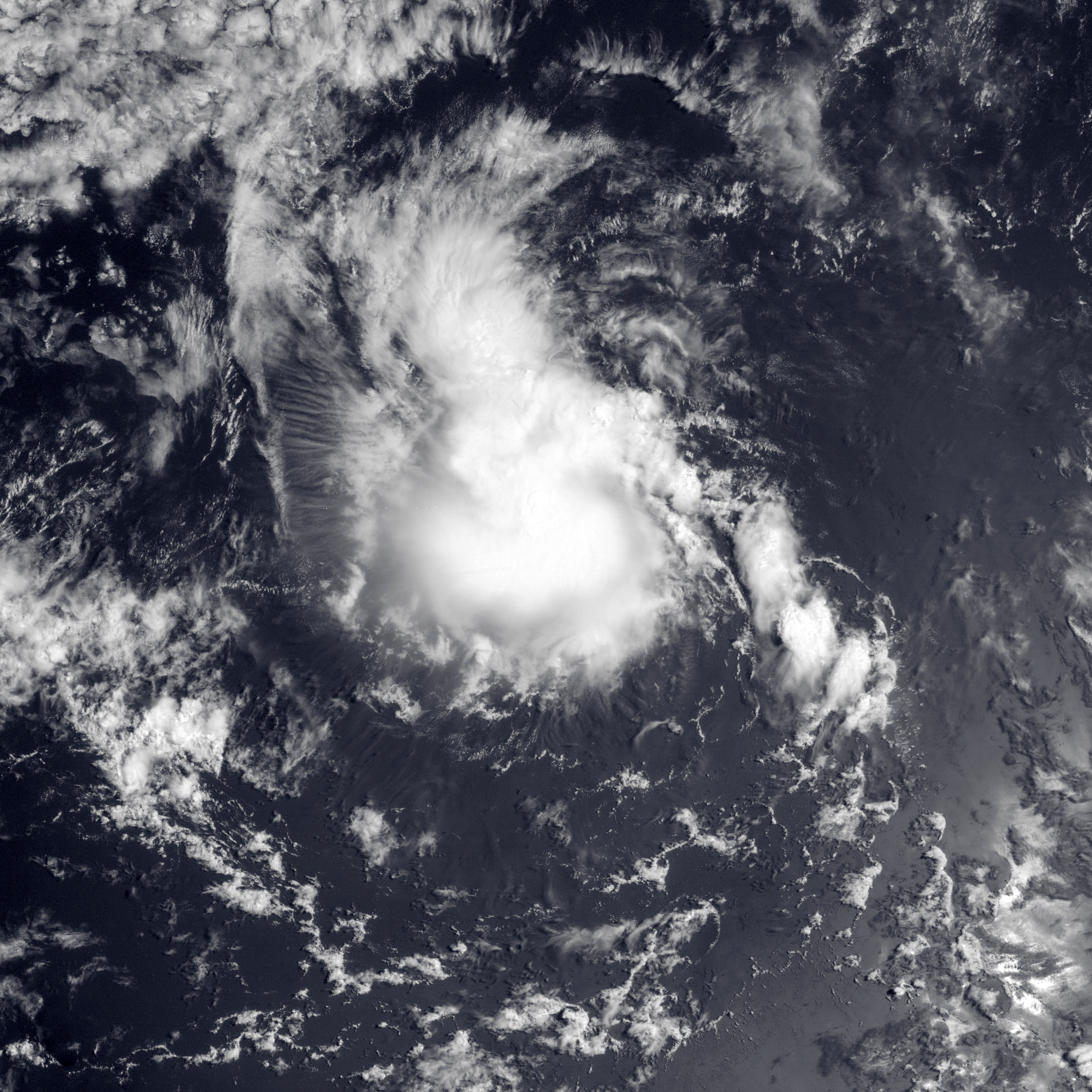
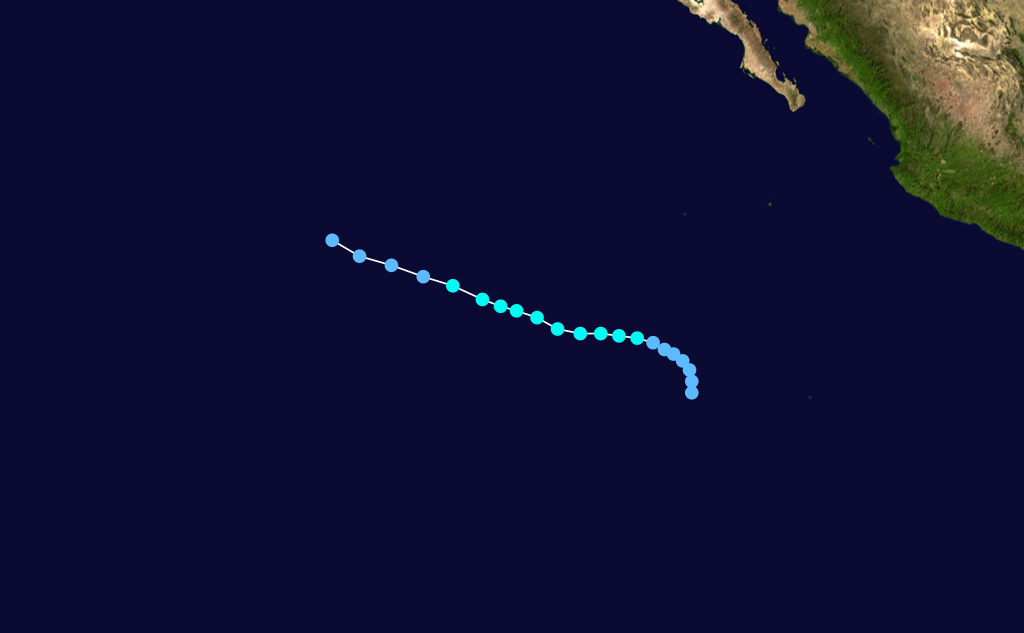
- Duration: August 10 – August 15
- Peak intensity: 50 mph (85 km/h) (1-min); 1000 mbar (hPa)

A tropical wave that had showed signs of development emerged into the East Pacific and organized into Tropical Depression Ten-E on August 10. Despite some wind shear, the depression managed to become a tropical storm late on August 11. Hilda reached its peak intensity as a moderate 50 mph (85 km/h) tropical storm the next day. After maintaining its peak intensity for 24 hours, it gradually weakened due to increasing wind shear On August 14, shear weakened Hilda to a depression and the cyclone dissipated early the next morning.

=== Tropical Storm Ignacio ===
- Tropical storm (SSHWS)
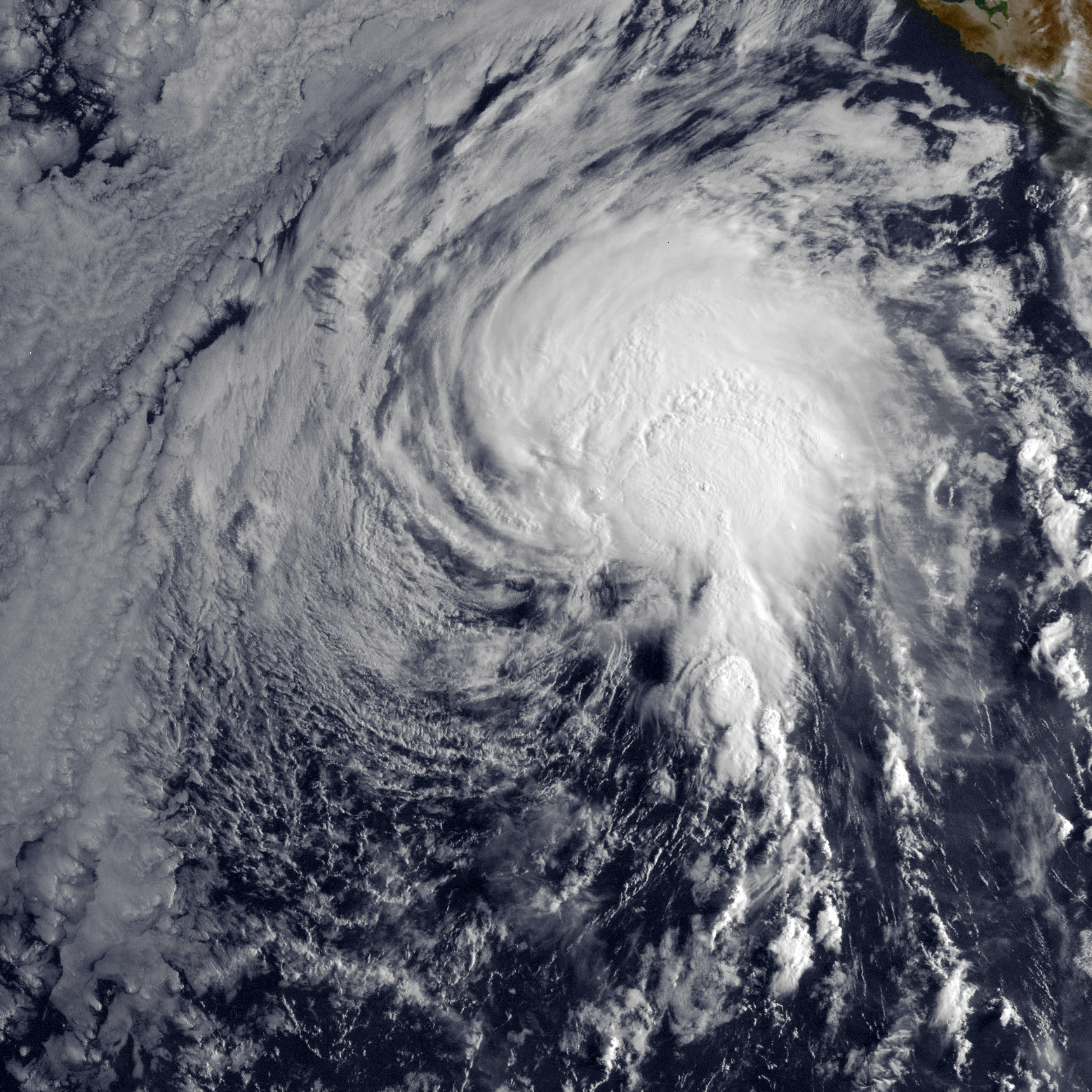
- Duration: August 17 – August 19
- Peak intensity: 40 mph (65 km/h) (1-min); 1005 mbar (hPa)

A broad region of active weather persisted west of Mexico during the middle of August 1997, which began organizing on August 16 as it developed rainbands. The thunderstorms organized around a circulation, evolving into a tropical depression early on August 17 while located approximately 520 mi (840 km) southwest of Cabo San Lucas. It formed outside of the area in which tropical cyclones usually form in the Eastern Pacific Ocean basin, and moved northwestward at 11 to 17 mph (18 to 27 km/h) under the steering currents of mid- to upper-level trough off the coast of California. After the depression developed a burst of deep convection over its center, the NHC upgraded it to Tropical Storm Ignacio at 12:00 UTC on August 17, with peak sustained winds of 40 mph (64 km/h) and a minimum pressure of 1,005 mbar (29.7 inHg). However, due to increasingly colder waters and the presence of inhibiting southwesterly wind shear, Ignacio weakened back into a tropical depression on August 18. A day later, the depression transitioned into an extratropical cyclone, which continued northward until dissipating a day later near the coast of California. Moisture from the system persisted as it passed through the state and the Pacific Northwest, ultimately merging with a larger extratropical cyclone involving the remnants of Hurricane Guillermo.

The remnants of Ignacio produced record rainfall across coastal California, including 0.98 in (25 mm) recorded in San Francisco on August 19; this was the wettest August day in the city's history. The rains caused a rare cancelation for the Oakland Athletics. The atypical rainfall triggered isolated flash flooding in some locations and a debris flow about 7 ft (2.1 m) deep. Wine grape were adversely impacted by the heavy rainfall from Ignacio, which ruined about 10% of the year's Chardonnay and Sauvignon grapes. The unfavorable growing conditions were compounded by further rains from Hurricane Linda in September, creating what was described as a "tumultuous" year for the crops. The storm contributed to at least 20 weather-related traffic accidents across the San Francisco area, with at least one of them classified as major. Two crashes on Interstate 80 forced the closure of four lanes for 30 minutes, while California State Route 9 was blocked in Saratoga by a large tree which fell due to saturated soil. Thunderstorms associated with the storm system left about 78,000 electric customers in Sonoma County without power after lightning struck a power substation. Lightning also knocked three workers unconscious in a vineyard near Lodi. Rainfall extended as far north as the northwestern United States, ending an unusually long, 35-day dry spell at Astoria, Oregon. It remains the most significant rainfall from a tropical cyclone in the state of Washington.

=== Hurricane Jimena ===
- Category 4 hurricane (SSHWS)
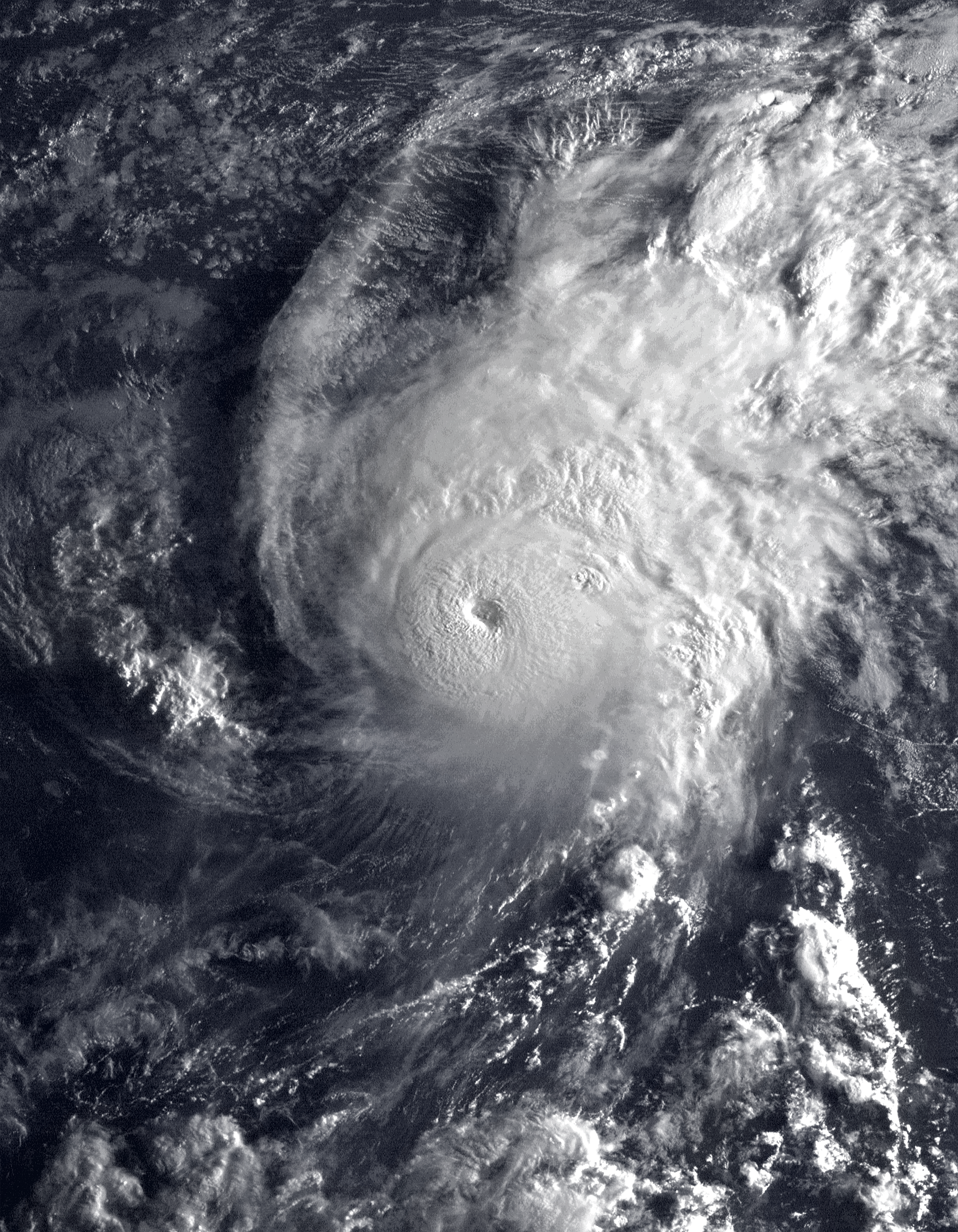
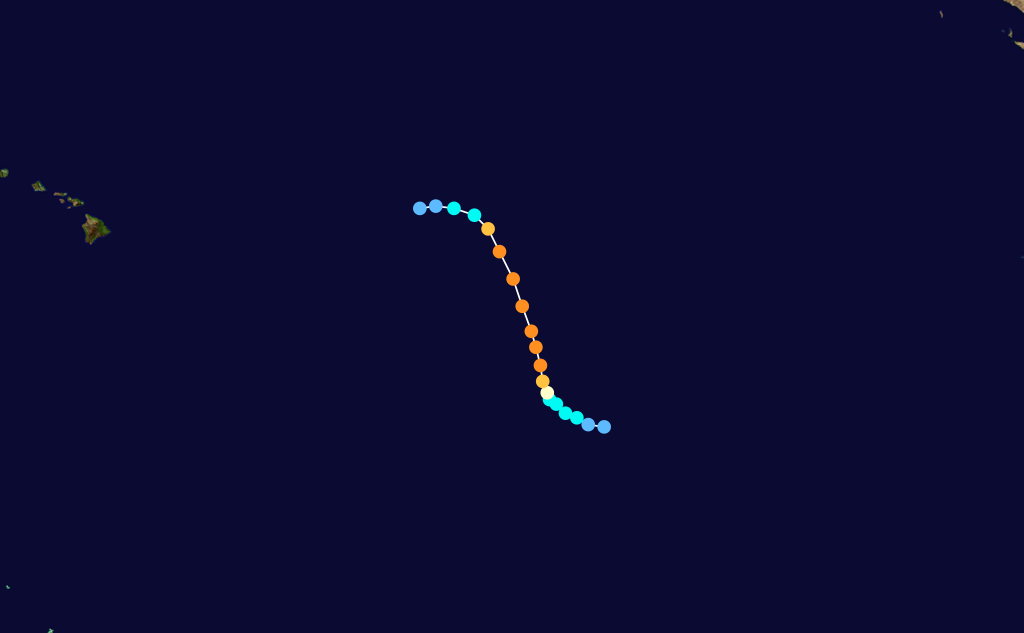
- Duration: August 25 – August 30
- Peak intensity: 140 mph (220 km/h) (1-min); 942 mbar (hPa)

During the third week of August, a tropical disturbance formed far from land. Although the system was located over warmer than average sea surface temperatures, the upper-level environment was initially unfavorable. However the environment gradually became more conducive for tropical cyclone formation and Tropical Depression Twelve-E formed August 25 from an area of disturbed weather in a rather easterly location. It became a tropical storm the next day and a hurricane on August 27. Intensification was rapid, with winds increasing from 75 mph (121 km/h) to 115 mph (185 km/h) in just 6 hours. Continuing to rapidly intensify, it reached its peak intensity as a low-end category 4 hurricane. After maintaining peak intensity for 30 hours, it moved north-northwest and encountered increasing wind shear which reduced its winds from 115 mph (185 km/h) to 35 mph (56 km/h) in just 24 hours. Jimena completely dissipated on August 30, not long after entering the Central Pacific Basin. Hurricane Jimena was of no threat to land.

=== Tropical Storm Oliwa ===
- Tropical storm (SSHWS)
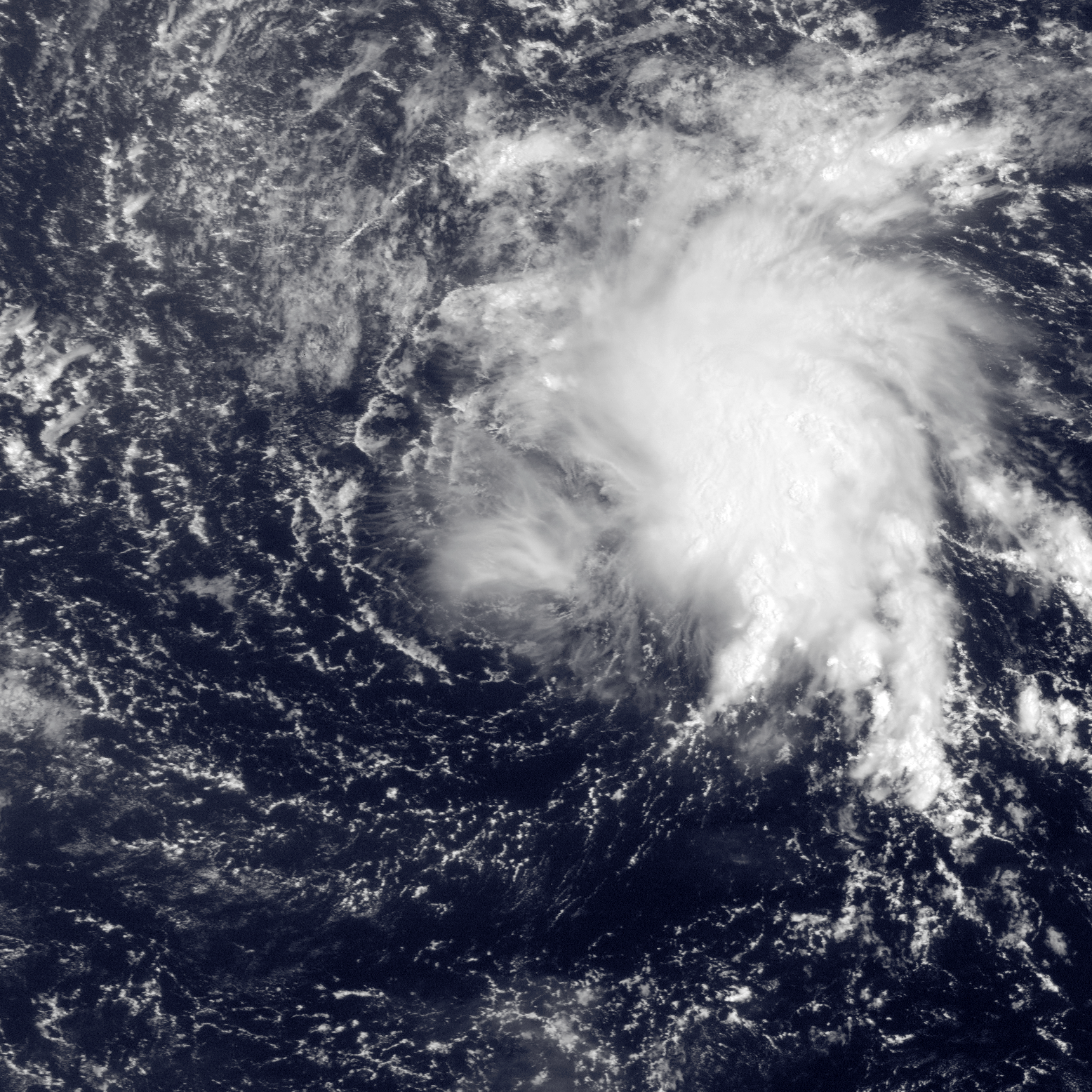
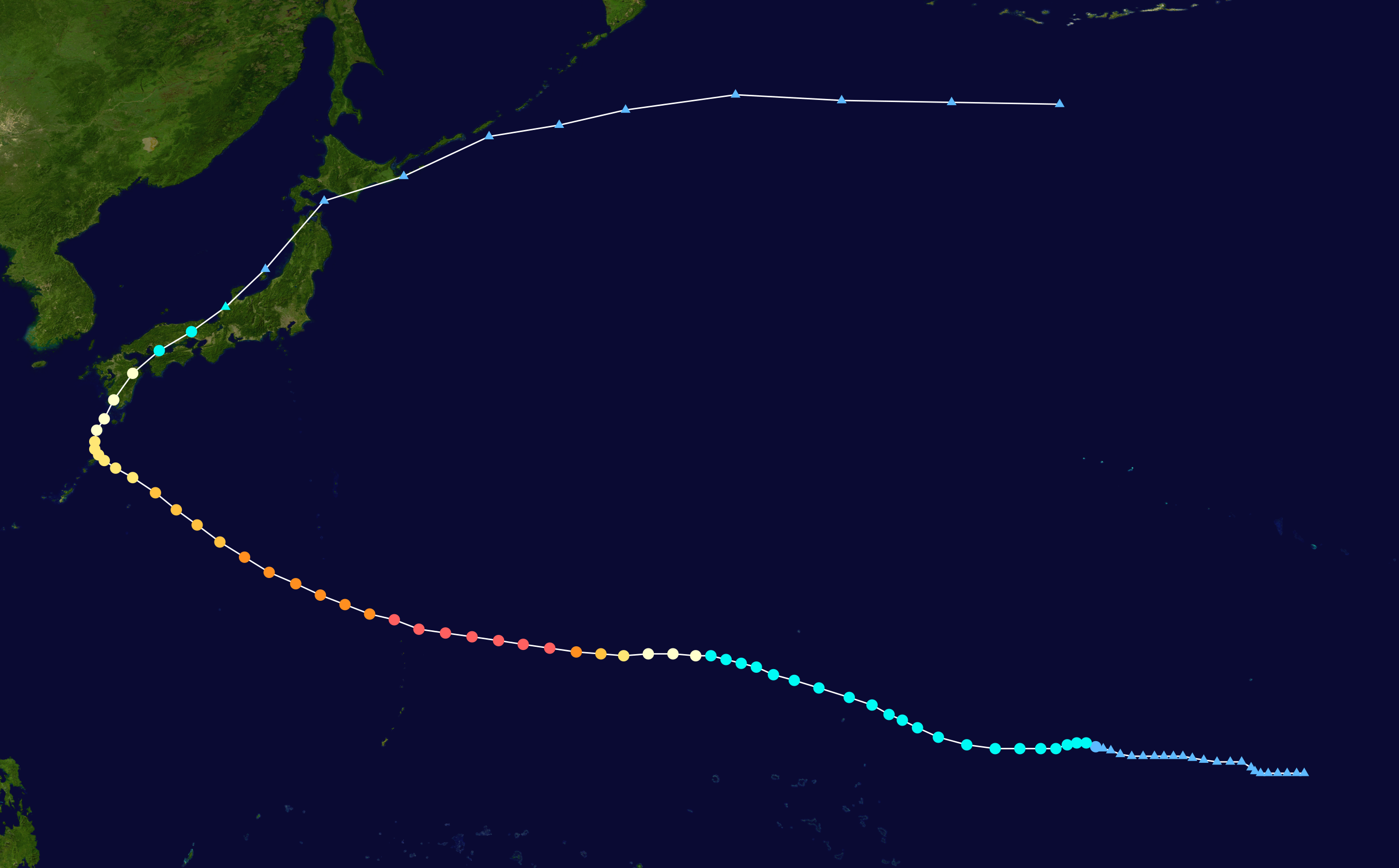
- Duration: September 2 – September 4 (Exited basin)
- Peak intensity: 40 mph (65 km/h) (1-min); 1004 mbar (hPa)

Tropical storm Oliwa began as a tropical disturbance that had meandered south of Johnston Atoll. It organized into Tropical Depression Two-C on September 2. Later that day, it was upgraded to Tropical Storm Oliwa (Hawaiian for Oliver) as it slowly moved towards the west. It crossed the dateline late on September 3 and entered the Joint Typhoon Warning Center's Area of Responsibility. Oliwa passed south of Wake Island on September 6, where it caused heavy rains but no damage. On September 7, Oliwa started a period of rapid strengthening, becoming a typhoon on September 8 and a Super Typhoon eight hours later. Oliwa stayed at that intensity for over two days. While still a strong typhoon, Oliwa passed near the Northern Marianas Islands. It then started weakening as it curved towards Japan. It made landfall as a minimal typhoon September 16. It quickly dissipated later that same day. Typhoon Oliwa caused 12 fatalities and left 30,000 people homeless. Damage totaled to 4.36 billion yen ($50.1 million USD).

=== Tropical Storm Kevin ===
- Tropical storm (SSHWS)
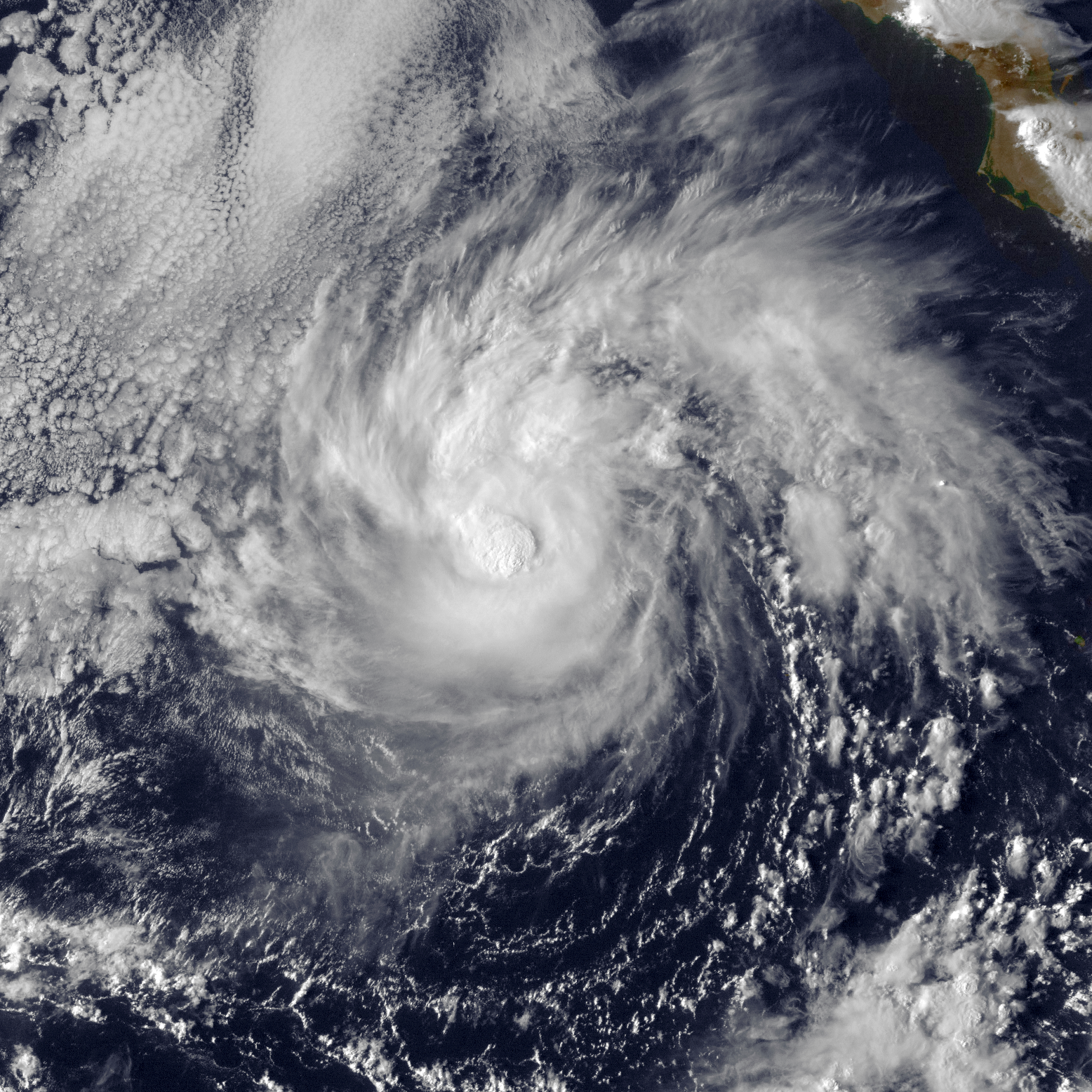
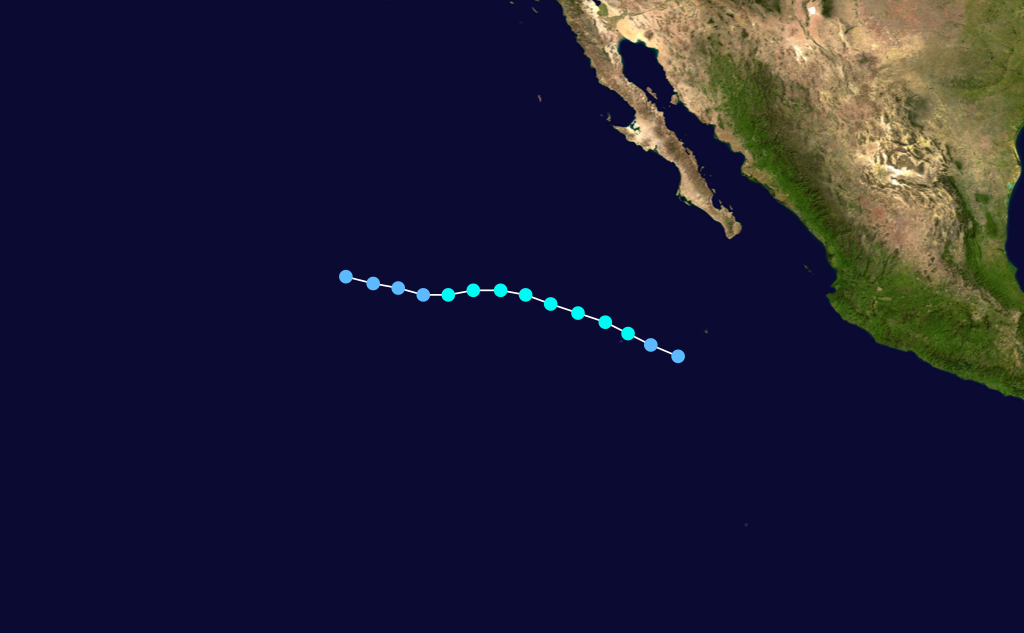
- Duration: September 3 – September 7
- Peak intensity: 60 mph (95 km/h) (1-min); 994 mbar (hPa)

Tropical Storm Kevin, first displayed hints of development while located near Panama, and developed a well-defined circulation after emerging into the Pacific. It was classified as a tropical depression in the Pacific on September 3 while located south-south west of Baja California. Convection increased and the outflow of the storm became better defined. As such, it became a tropical storm on the morning of September 4. Gradually intensifying, it reached it peak intensity as a mid-level tropical storm on September 5. As it moved westbound, it maintained its intensity for 12 hours. The environment was unfavorable, and two days later, Kevin weakened to a depression when deep convection ceased. It dissipated early on September 7, having never posed a threat to land.

=== Hurricane Linda ===
- Category 5 hurricane (SSHWS)
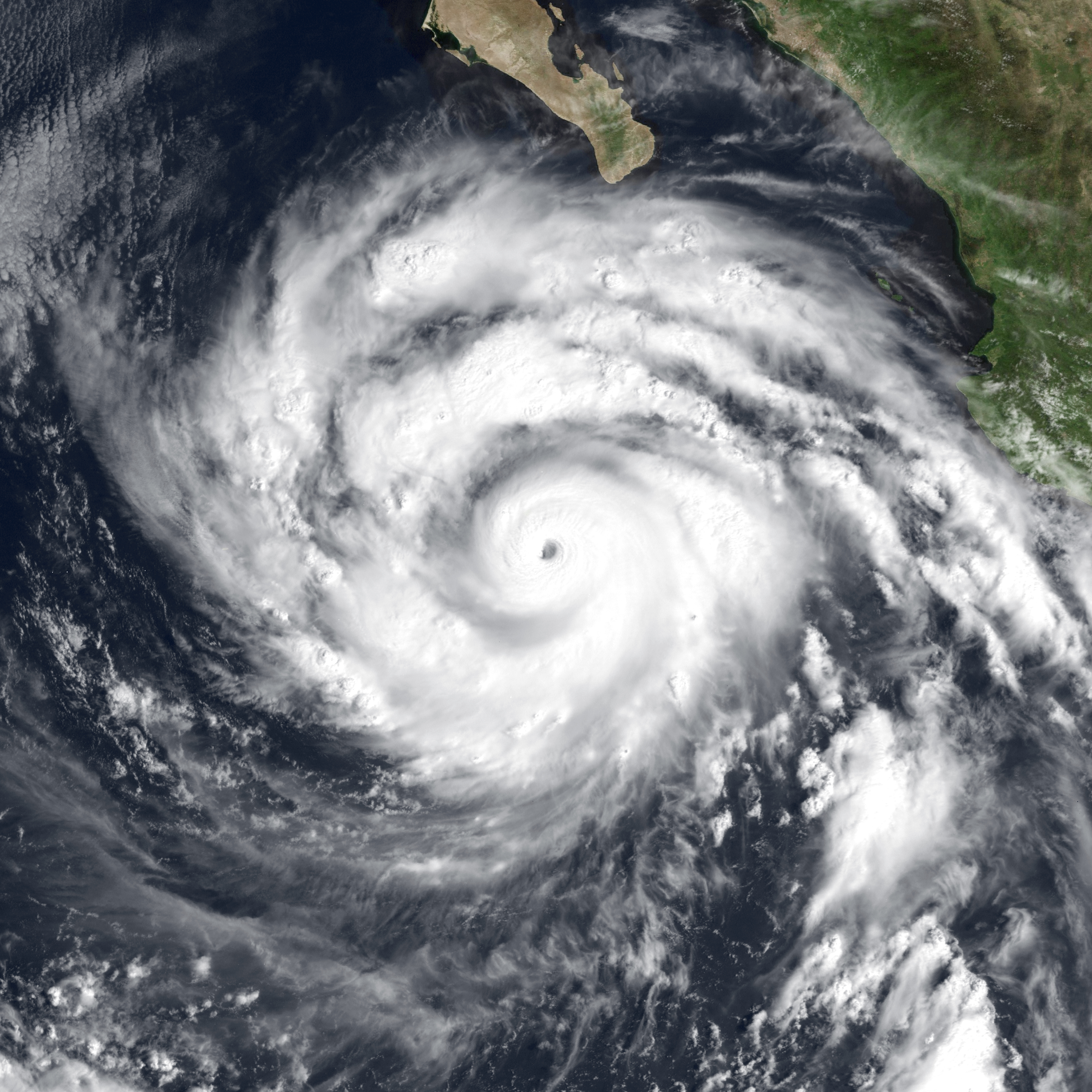
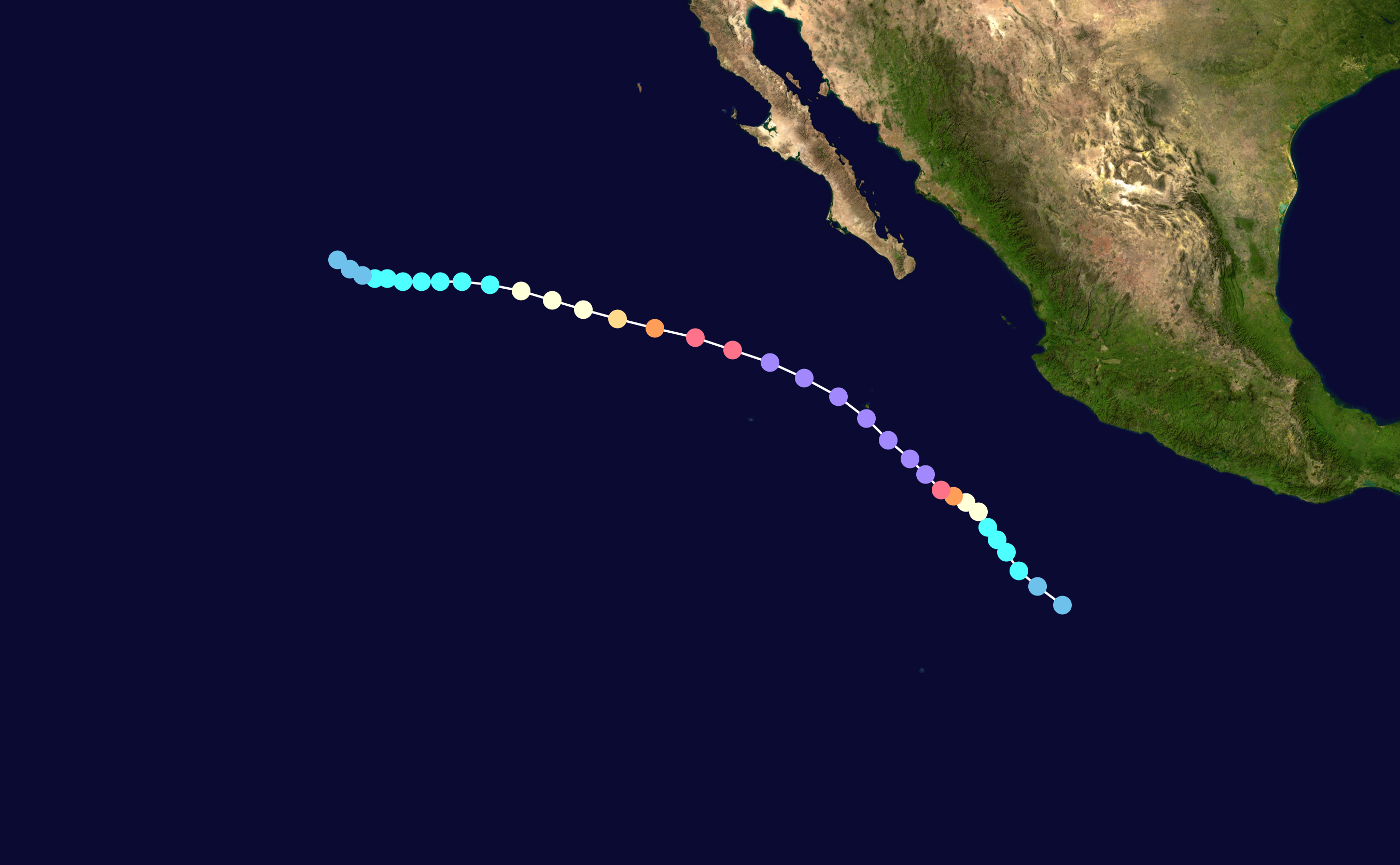
- Duration: September 9 – September 17
- Peak intensity: 185 mph (295 km/h) (1-min); 902 mbar (hPa)

A tropical disturbance formed on September 9 and became Tropical Depression Fourteen-E later that day. The cyclone moved northwest and strengthened into a tropical storm on September 10. Linda then rapidly intensified, reaching hurricane intensity the next day as an eye formed. On September 12, Linda reached its peak intensity, with maximum sustained winds of 295 km/h (185 mph)—making it a Category 5 hurricane on the Saffir-Simpson Hurricane Scale—and a minimum pressure of 902 mbar (902 hPa), making it the most intense Pacific hurricane ever recorded until Hurricane Patricia surpassed it in 2015. However, Linda soon moved over cooler waters, and began to weaken, falling below hurricane intensity on September 16. It then slowly weakened and dissipated on September 17.

Linda passed very near Socorro Island. In addition, early forecasts predicted that Linda would make landfall in California. The landfall never materialized and warnings or watches were not necessary for any location. However, Linda caused large surf, which crashed ashore in California, where it swept five people off a jetty. Moisture related to Linda also contributed to a landslide in southern California that destroyed or damaged 79 houses.

=== Tropical Storm Marty ===
- Tropical storm (SSHWS)
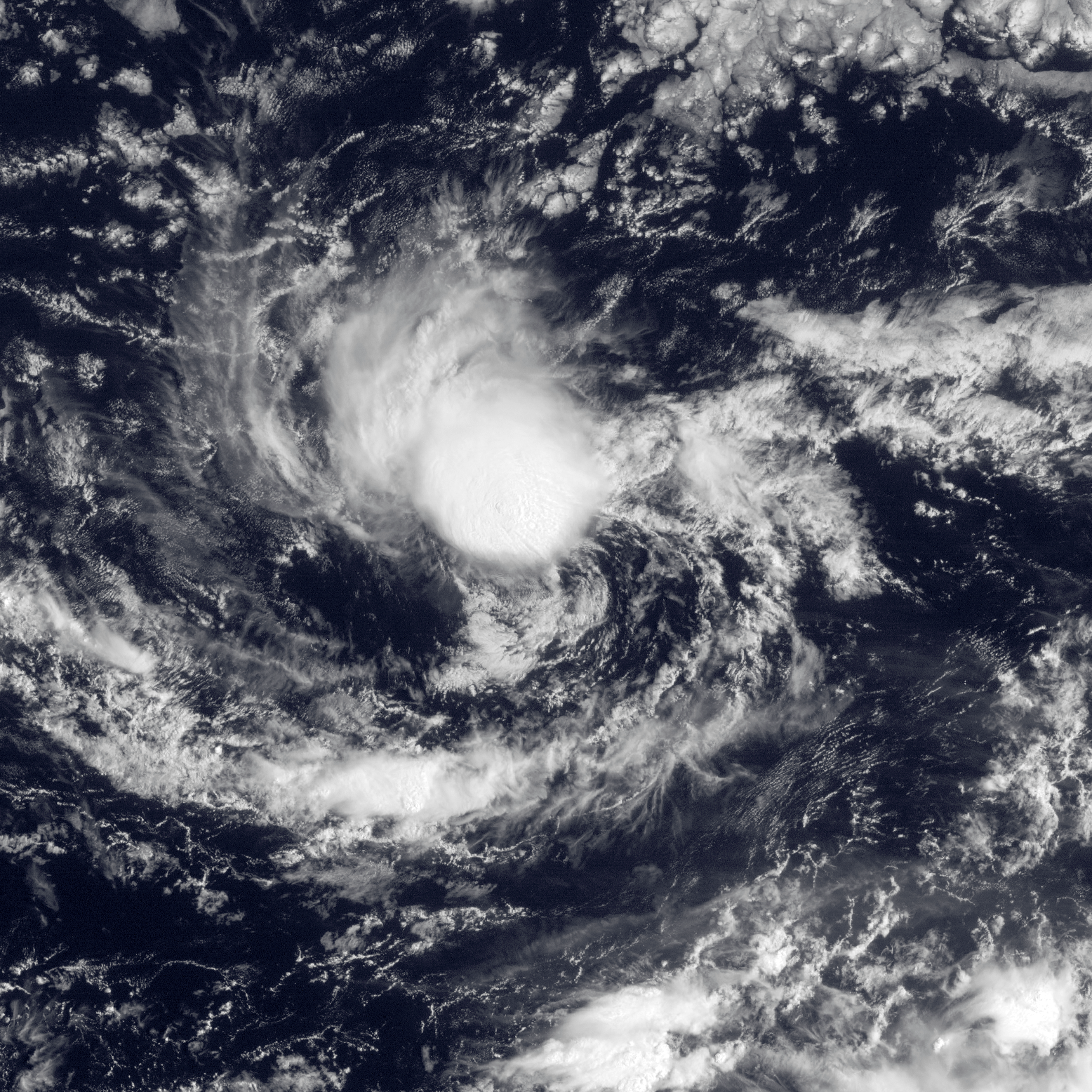
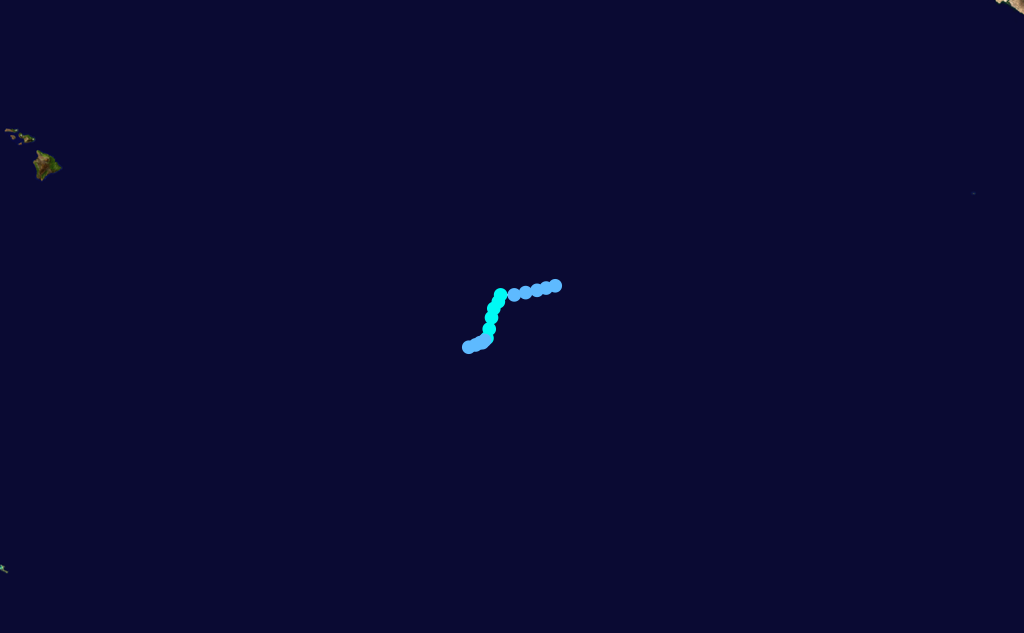
- Duration: September 12 – September 16
- Peak intensity: 45 mph (75 km/h) (1-min); 1002 mbar (hPa)

An area of disturbed weather formed early on September 10. It became better organized two days later as convection increased, and then organized into Tropical Depression Fifteen-E late on September 12. Moving slowly in a westward direction, it strengthened into a tropical storm in the morning of September 14. Later that day, the system reached its peak intensity of 45 mph (72 km/h). Meanwhile, the storm's forward speed slowed down even more, and it turned to the south. It then encountered an area of strong wind shear, and it weakened into a depression on September 15 as the center of circulation became displaced from the deep convection. The shear continued to weaken, and the tropical cyclone dissipated late on September 16. There were no deaths or damage.

=== Hurricane Nora ===
- Category 4 hurricane (SSHWS)
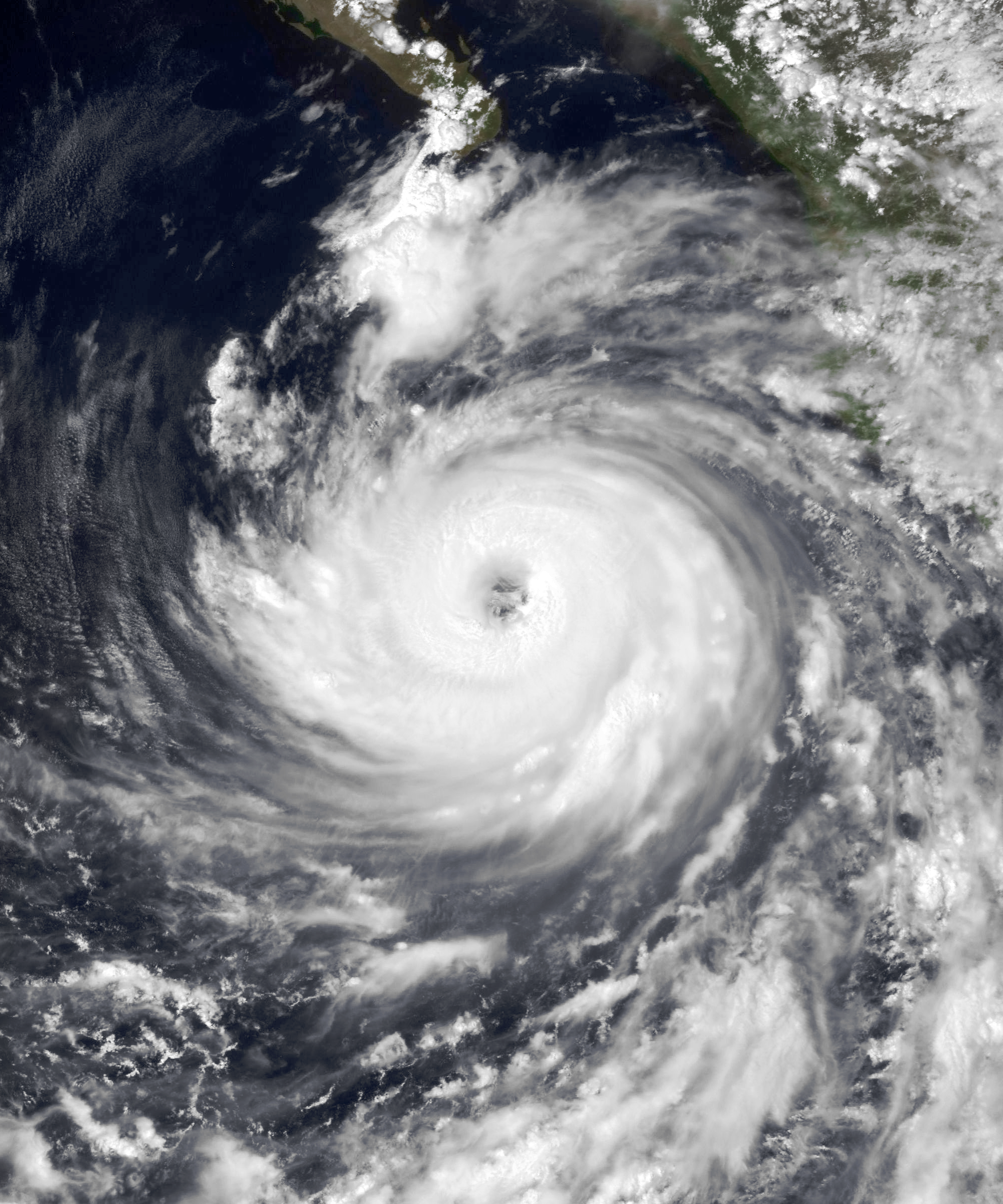
- Duration: September 16 – September 26
- Peak intensity: 130 mph (215 km/h) (1-min); 950 mbar (hPa)

A large area of disturbed weather moved into the Pacific on September 12. It then organized into Tropical Depression Sixteen-E on September 16 and quickly strengthened into a tropical storm. Early on September 18, a poorly defined and ragged eye appeared on infrared imagery. Shortly thereafter, its winds reached 165 km/h (105 mph). Nora eventually peaked at Category 4. It then encountered water temperature anomalies, and fluctuated in strength. Then, a trough pulled Nora northward and accelerated the storm. After weakening to a Category 1, Nora made landfall in northern Baja California and stayed a tropical storm as it entered the United States. At that time, however, most of the deep rest convection was displaced to the northeast. Nora dissipated over Arizona, but its remnants kept going north.

Hurricane Nora was the first Pacific hurricane to bring gale-force winds to the Continental United States since Kathleen in 1976. In Mexico, Nora produced high waves, flooding, and heavy damage. Many homes were destroyed. In the United States, rains were heavy, and damage amounted to several hundred million dollars. Several hundred people were rendered homeless, and there was wind and flood damage in Arizona. Nora killed two people in Mexico, and several indirect deaths were reported in California.

=== Tropical Storm Olaf ===
- Tropical storm (SSHWS)
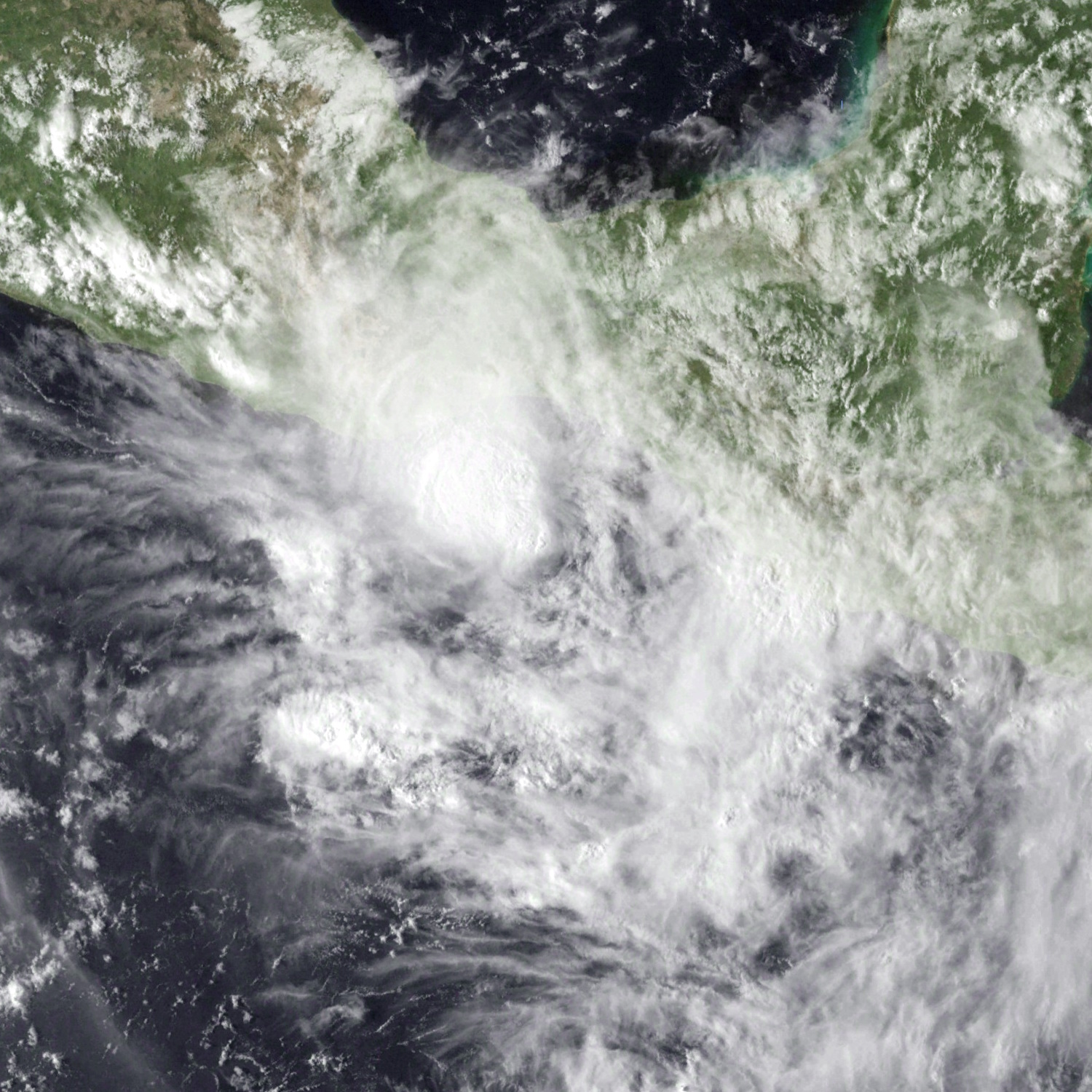
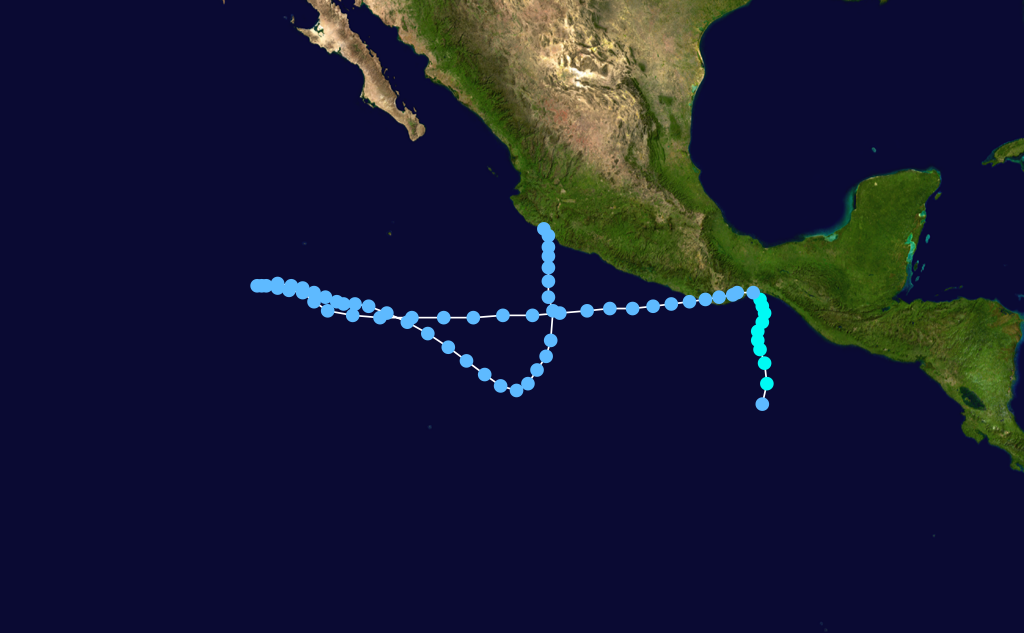
- Duration: September 26 – October 12
- Peak intensity: 70 mph (110 km/h) (1-min); 989 mbar (hPa)

A tropical disturbance left Central America on September 22. Despite some wind shear, the system gradually became better organized and a tropical depression formed September 26, being upgraded to a tropical storm several hours later. The cyclone immediately moved north. Instead of strengthening into a hurricane before landfall as forecasted, Olaf weakened due to its proximity to land. On September 29, Olaf made landfall near Salina Cruz, Oaxaca.

Olaf, as a tropical depression, moved westward, far out to sea. Operationally, Olaf was believed to have dissipated for six days. however, in the Tropical Cyclone Report, a report issued several months after the hurricane's duration, it was believed to have remained a tropical cyclone the entire time. After restrengthening slightly, Olaf moved southeast on October 5 due to the influence of Hurricane Pauline. Olaf then turned north, and on October 12 made a second landfall near Manzanillo, Colima, as a tropical depression. Olaf's surface circulation weakened, and its remnants moved back out to sea, but did not redevelop.

Olaf resulted in some reports of damage and flooding in Mexico and Guatemala. During two time frames, from September 27 through October 2 and 10 through October 16, a total of 27.73 inches (704 mm) of rainfall fell in association with Olaf in Soyalapa/Comaltepec. Several people were reported missing. Most of its damage was from its first landfall. Throughout southern Mexico, Guatemala and El Salvador, flooding caused by Olaf was blamed for eighteen deaths.

=== Hurricane Pauline ===
- Category 4 hurricane (SSHWS)
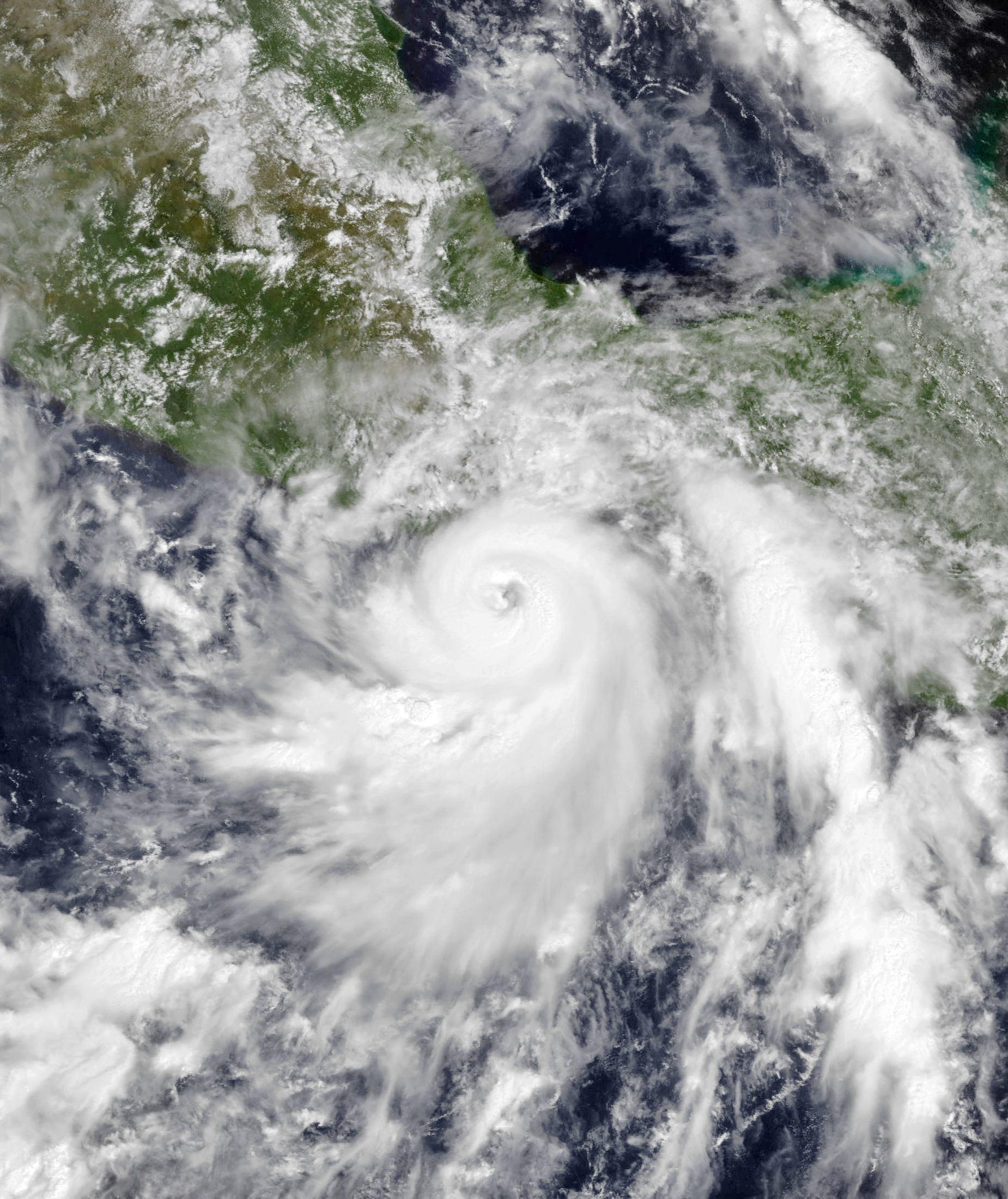
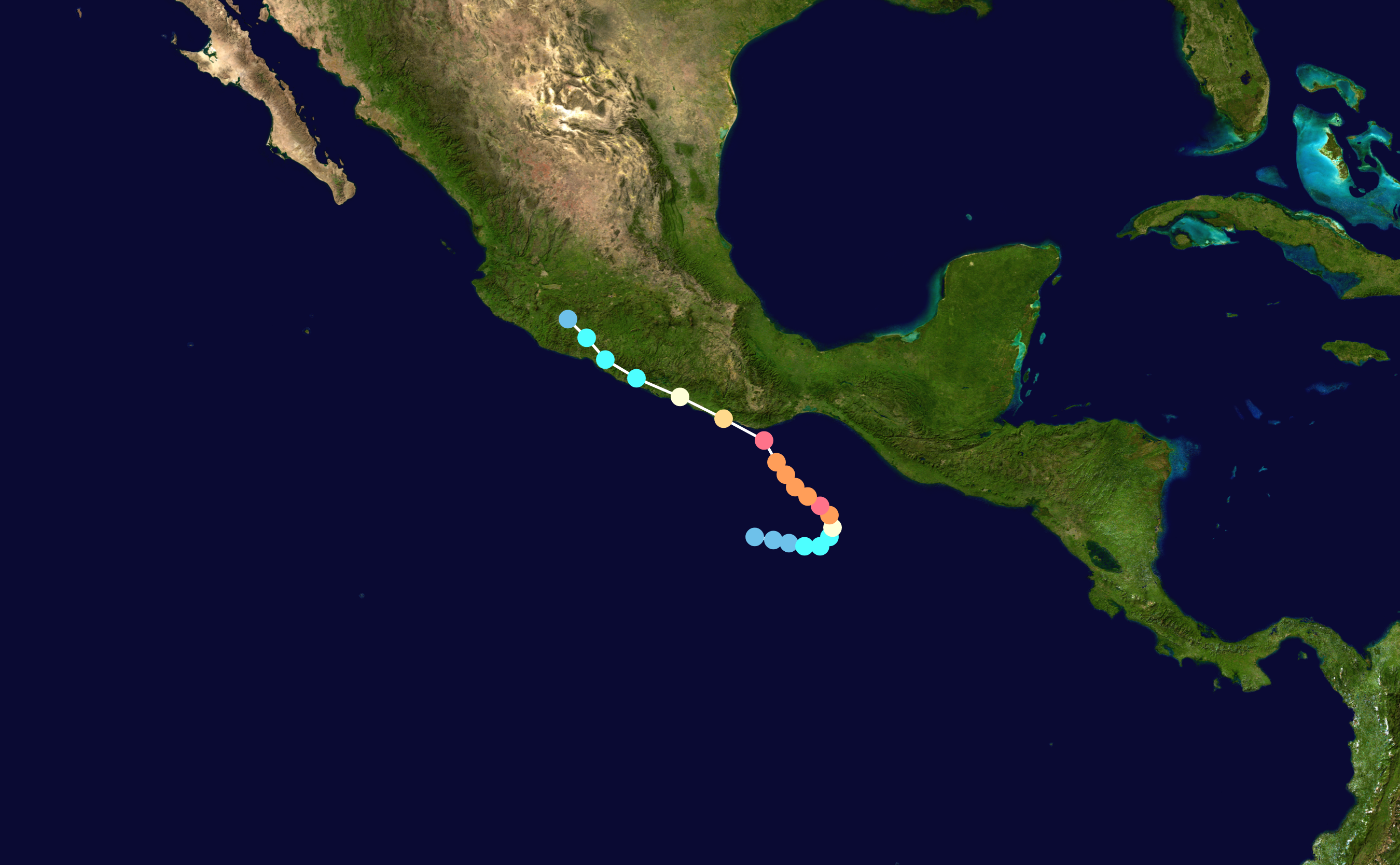
- Duration: October 5 – October 10
- Peak intensity: 130 mph (215 km/h) (1-min); 948 mbar (hPa)

On October 3, a distinct area of disturbed weather formed. It drifted eastbound, and a well-defined low pressure soon formed. It became Tropical Depression Eighteen-E on October 5. Early the next day it intensified into tropical Storm Pauline. An eye feature developed on October 7 and as such Pauline was upgraded into a hurricane. In a favorable environment, the cyclone rapidly intensified, reaching Category 4 intensity. After fluctuating in intensity, interaction with land weakened Pauline to a Category 2 by the time it made landfall on October 9. It accelerated to the northwest, and passed over a mountainous region. The mountains disrupted Pauline's circulation, and squeezed the moisture from the hurricane. Pauline dissipated on October 10 while over Jalisco.

Hurricane Pauline was the deadliest storm of the season. Landslides and flooding caused by heavy rain caused hundreds of deaths and left thousands homeless. There were at least 230 casualties. The Red Cross reported that 400 people died, but this was disputed by Mexican officials. Pauline was Mexico's deadliest hurricane since 1976's Liza. In addition, the hurricane caused $447.8 million in damage (1997 USD).

=== Hurricane Rick ===
- Category 2 hurricane (SSHWS)
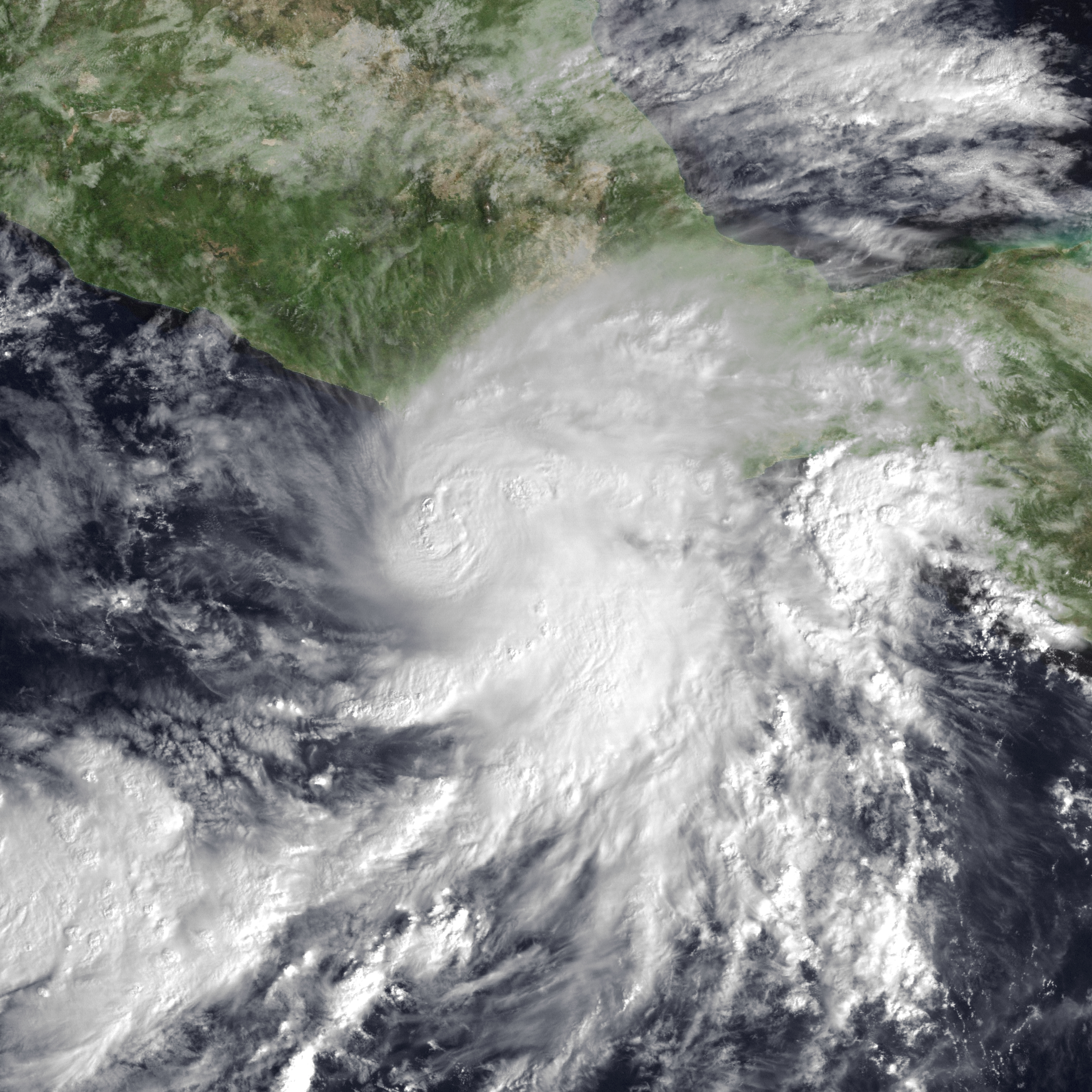
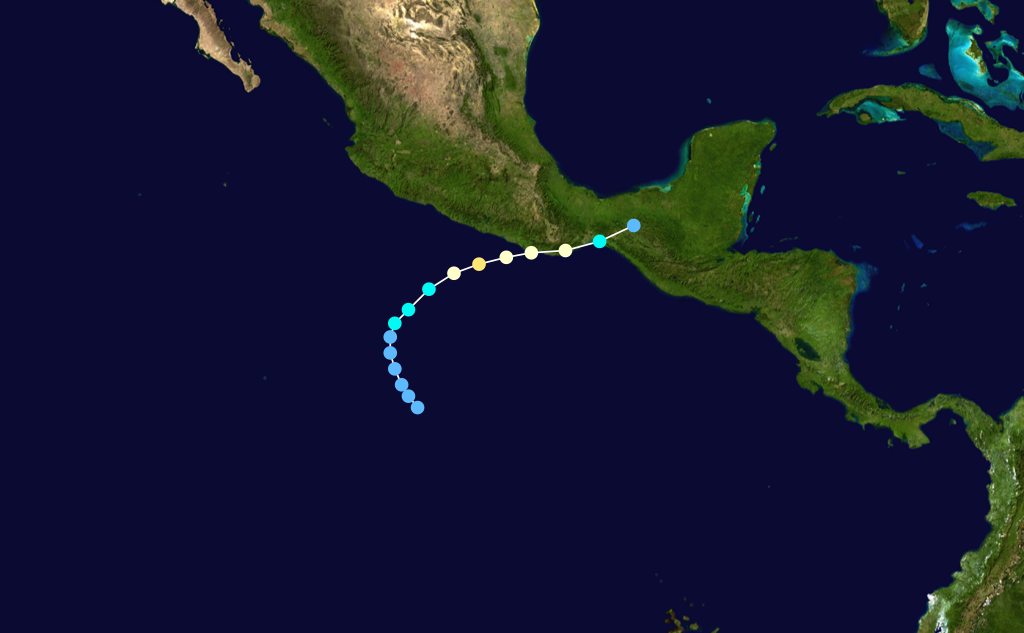
- Duration: November 7 – November 10
- Peak intensity: 100 mph (155 km/h) (1-min); 973 mbar (hPa)

The first hurricane in November since 1991 formed from a tropical disturbance. Although the circulation was initially poorly defined, it later acquired enough organization and was classified as a tropical depression on November 7. It moved north until a trough of low pressure turned it to the northeast. It was named on November 8, and was upgraded to a hurricane the next day. It reached its peak intensity of 100 mph (160 km/h) and 973 mbar (hPa). Rick made landfall in Oaxaca – the same area devastated by Hurricane Pauline one month earlier – and quickly weakened, dissipating early on November 11.

The storm downed trees, washed out recently repaired roads, and disrupted communications in some small population centers. A total of 10.47 inches (266 mm) of rain was reported at Astata/San Pedro Huameluca near the point of landfall in Mexico.

=== Tropical Storm Paka ===
- Tropical storm (SSHWS)
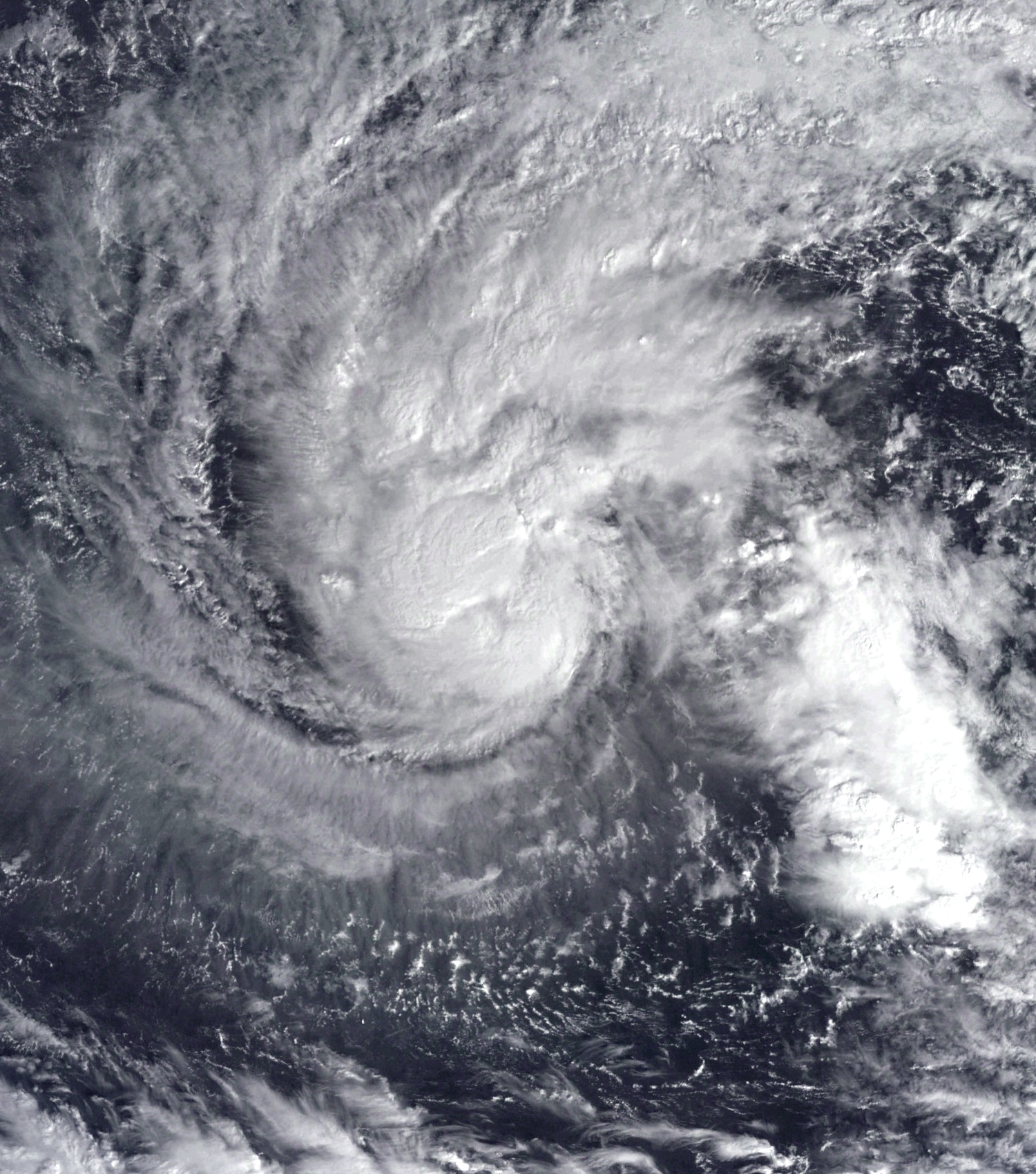
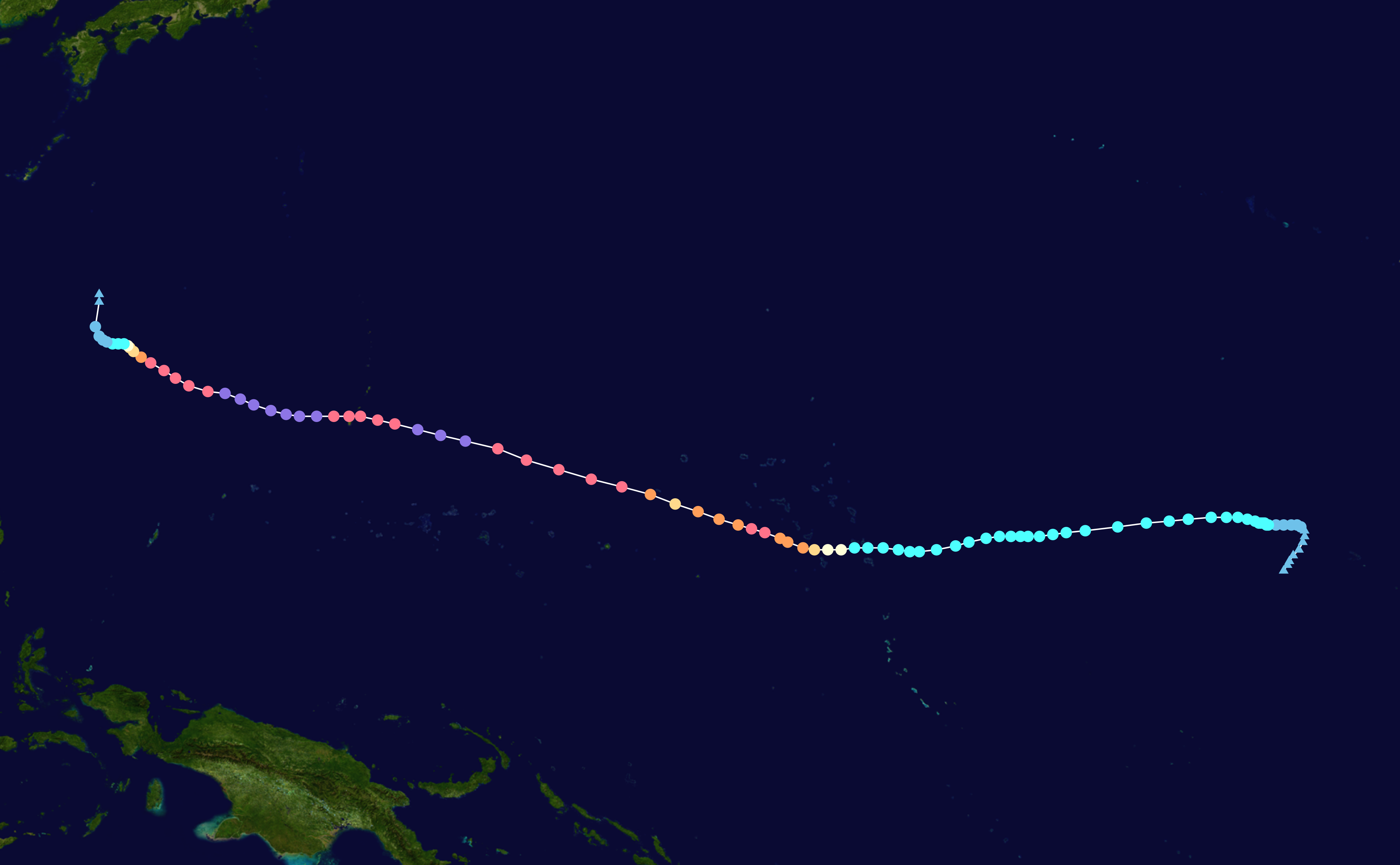
- Duration: November 28 – December 6 (Exited basin)
- Peak intensity: 65 mph (100 km/h) (1-min); 992 mbar (hPa)

Tropical Depression Five-C formed on December 2, two days after the season ended. It was the second December tropical depression east of the dateline; 1983's Hurricane Winnie was the only other one at the time. The depression strengthened into Tropical Storm Paka (Hawaiian for Pat) while west of Palmyra Atoll. The system began to move westward at a steady pace. As Paka moved westward, dry air and wind shear disrupted its development until it crossed the dateline on December 6.

After entering the Western Pacific, the cyclone encountered a more favorable environment, resulting in rapid intensification. It became a typhoon on December 10 and passed near Kwajalein with winds of 120 mph (190 km/h). It strengthened further, twice reaching Category 5 intensity. While a super typhoon, Paka passed close to Guam on December 17, causing major damage. Afterwards, Paka encountered a hostile environment and had completely dissipated by the evening of December 22.

=== Other systems ===
Tropical Depression Three-E formed June 21. Moving rapidly westward, it never strengthened and the winds of the depression soon decreased. It dissipated early on June 24. On the afternoon of June 29, Tropical Depression Five-E formed. It erratically moved westward. During July 1, an upper-level low to the south of Baja California cut off the north-easterly vertical windshear that the depression had been encountering, which caused deep convection to redevelop near the systems center and the NHC to resume issuing advisories. The depression dissipated on July 4

Tropical Depression One-C formed on July 26 from a disturbance that had been showing signs of organization for the past three days. It moved west to southwest through an unfavorable environment. On the morning of July 27, it dissipated due to strong wind shear caused by an upper-level trough.

On October 6, Tropical Depression-C formed near 140°W. The waters were very warm, and there was only moderate wind shear. However, the depression slowly moved westward without intensifying, and dissipated the next day.

Towards the end of October, a tropical disturbance developed well to the southeast of the Hawaiian Islands and became better organized over the next few days, as it moved westwards along 10°N. During October 31, after atmospheric convection had increased, the CPHC initiated advisories and designated the system as Tropical Depression Four-C. Although the waters were very warm, some dry air was located north of the system. It slowly moved westward without intensifying, and dissipated the next day as the circulation became exposed.

== Storm names ==
The following list of names was used for named storms that formed in the North Pacific Ocean east of 140°W in 1997. This is the same list used for the 1991 season except for Felicia, which replaced Fefa, and Dolores, which had been spelled "Delores" that year. The name Felicia was used for the first time in 1997.

- Andres
- Blanca
- Carlos
- Dolores *
- Enrique
- Felicia *
- Guillermo *
- Hilda
- Ignacio
- Jimena *
- Kevin
- Linda
- Marty
- Nora
- Olaf
- Pauline
- Rick
- Sandra (unused)
- Terry (unused)
- Vivian (unused)
- Waldo (unused)
- Xina (unused)
- York (unused)
- Zelda (unused)

For storms that form in the North Pacific from 140°W to the International Date Line, the names come from a series of four rotating lists. Names are used one after the other without regard to year, and when the bottom of one list is reached, the next named storm receives the name at the top of the next list. Two named storms, listed below, formed in the central North Pacific in 1997. Named storms in the table above that crossed into the area during the year are noted (*).

- Oliwa
- Paka

=== Retirement ===
In the spring of 1998, the World Meteorological Organization (WMO) retired the name Pauline from future use in the Eastern Pacific on accounts of impacts in southern Mexico. It was replaced with Patricia for the 2003 season. Later, in 2007, the WMO retired the name Paka from future use in the Central Pacific due to its impacts on Guam. The name Pama was chosen as its replacement.

== Season effects ==
This is a table of all of the tropical cyclones that formed in the 1997 Pacific hurricane season. It includes their name, duration (within the basin), peak classification and intensities, areas affected, damage, and death totals. Deaths in parentheses are additional and indirect (an example of an indirect death would be a traffic accident), but were still related to that storm. Damage and deaths include totals while the storm was extratropical, a wave, or a low, and all of the damage figures are in 1997 USD.

Saffir–Simpson scale
TD	TS	C1	C2	C3	C4	C5

1997 Pacific tropical cyclone season statistics
Storm name	Dates active	Storm category at peak intensity	Max 1-min wind mph (km/h)	Min. press. (mbar)	Areas affected	Damage (US$)	Deaths	Ref(s).
Andres	June 1–7	Tropical storm	50 (85)	998	El Salvador, Nicaragua, Southwestern Mexico	Unknown	4	
Blanca	June 9–12	Tropical storm	45 (75)	1002	Southwestern Mexico	Minimal	None	
Three-E	June 21–24	Tropical depression	35 (55)	1006	None	None	None	
Carlos	June 25–28	Tropical storm	50 (85)	996	None	None	None	
Five-E	June 29 – July 4	Tropical depression	35 (55)	1004	None	None	None	
Dolores	July 5–12	Category 1 hurricane	90 (150)	975	None	None	None	
Enrique	July 12–16	Category 3 hurricane	115 (185)	960	None	None	None	
Felicia	July 14–22	Category 4 hurricane	130 (215)	948	None	None	None	
One-C	July 26–22	Tropical depression	35 (55)	1007	None	None	None	
Guillermo	July 30 – August 15	Category 5 hurricane	160 (260)	919	California, Hawaiian Islands, Aleutian Islands	Unknown	3	
Hilda	August 10–15	Tropical storm	50 (85)	1000	None	None	None	
Ignacio	August 17–19	Tropical storm	40 (65)	1005	California, Pacific Northwest	Minimal	None	
Jimena	August 25–30	Category 4 hurricane	150 (240)	942	None	None	None	
Oliwa	September 2–3	Tropical storm	40 (65)	1004	None (before crossover)	None	None	
Kevin	September 3–7	Tropical storm	65 (100)	994	None	None	None	
Linda	September 9–17	Category 5 hurricane	185 (295)	902	Western Mexico, Southwestern United States	$3.2 million	None	
Marty	September 12–16	Tropical storm	45 (75)	1002	None	None	None	
Nora	September 16–26	Category 4 hurricane	130 (215)	950	Western Mexico, Southwestern United States	$100 million	6	
Olaf	September 26 – October 12	Tropical storm	70 (110)	989	Southwestern Mexico, Central America, El Salvador, Guatemala	Unknown	18	
Pauline	October 5–10	Category 4 hurricane	130 (215)	948	Southern Mexico	$448 million	230–500	
Three-C	October 6–7	Tropical depression	30 (45)	1008	Hawaiian Islands	None	None	
Four-C	October 30–31	Tropical depression	35 (55)	1012	None	None	None	
Rick	November 7–10	Category 2 hurricane	100 (155)	973	Southwestern Mexico, Central America, Yucatan Peninsula	Minimal	None	
Paka	November 28 – December 6	Tropical storm	70 (110)	992	None (before crossover)	None	None	
Season aggregates
24 systems	June 1 – December 6		260 (160)	902		$551 million	267–537	

== See also ==
- List of Pacific hurricane records
- Pacific hurricane season
- 1997 Atlantic hurricane season
- 1997 Pacific typhoon season
- 1997 North Indian Ocean cyclone season
- South-West Indian Ocean cyclone seasons: 1996–97, 1997–98
- Australian region cyclone seasons: 1996–97, 1997–98
- South Pacific cyclone seasons: 1996–97, 1997–98
