= Anders (disambiguation) =

Anders is a given name and a surname of Scandinavian origin.

Anders may also refer to:

- Anders (crater) on the Moon
- 4815 Anders, an asteroid
- Anders Peak, a mountain in Antarctica
- WPB Anders, a family of Polish medium tracked combat vehicles
- Socialistische Partij Anders (now Vooruit), a Flemish political party in Belgium
- Anders (previously Open VLD), a Flemish political party in Belgium
- Anders (singer), Canadian singer Anders Ly (born 1995)
- Anders (Dragon Age), a character in the Dragon Age series

== See also ==
- Anders Army, a World War II Eastern Front unit
- Ander
