= Quiel =

Quiel is a surname. Notable people with the surname include:

- Hildegard Quiel (1888–1971), German composer
- Peter Quiel (born 1997), Filipino volleyball player

== See also ==
- List of storms named Quiel
