= 1987 Pacific hurricane season =

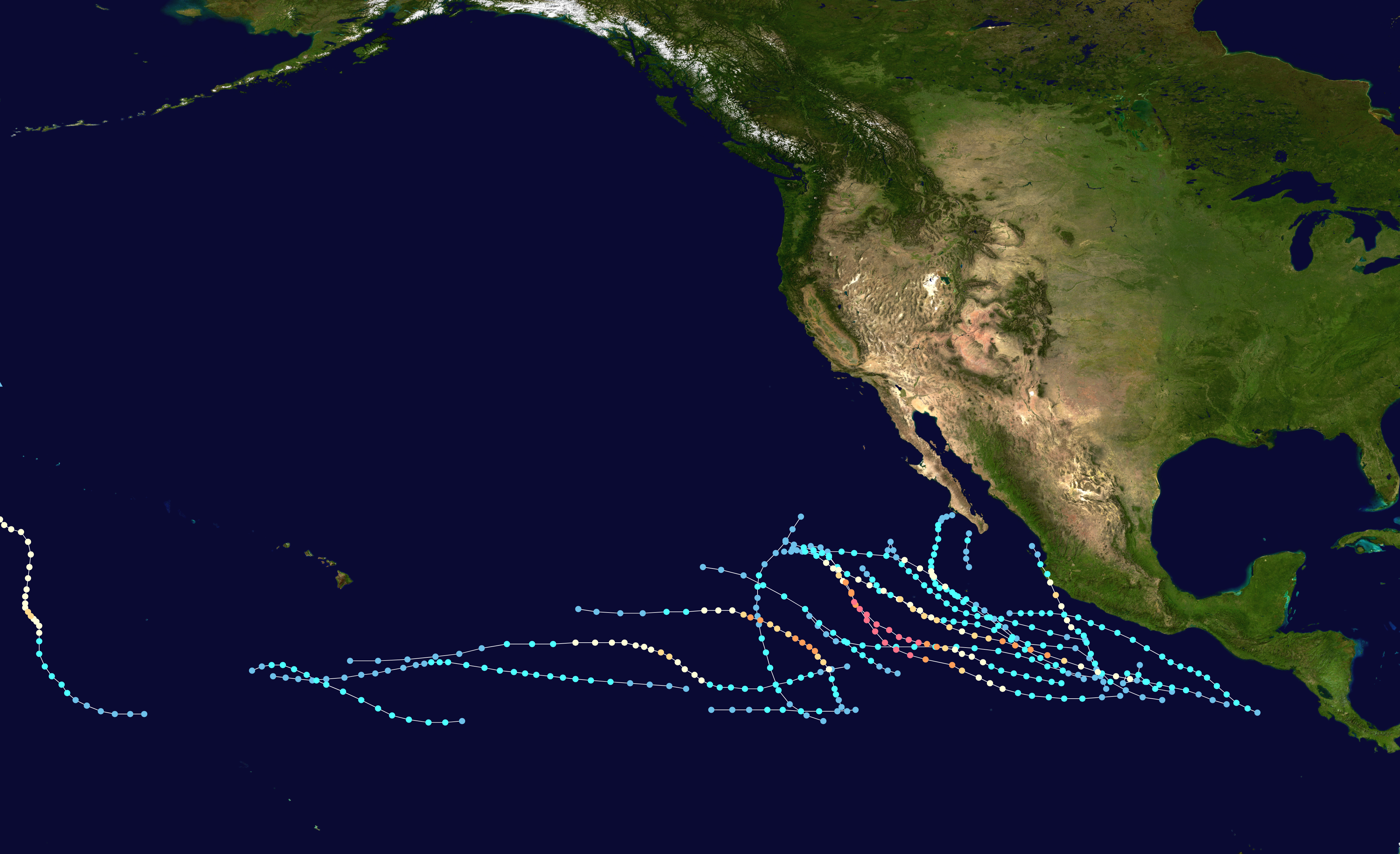
- Season summary map

Seasonal boundaries
- First system formed: June 7, 1987
- Last system dissipated: November 25, 1987

Strongest storm
- Name: Max
  - Maximum winds: 155 mph (250 km/h) (1-minute sustained)

Seasonal statistics
- Total storms: 20
- Hurricanes: 10
- Major hurricanes (Cat. 3+): 4
- Total fatalities: 8 total
- Total damage: $144.1 million (1987 USD)

Related articles
- 1987 Atlantic hurricane season; 1987 Pacific typhoon season; 1987 North Indian Ocean cyclone season

The 1987 Pacific hurricane season was the last year in which the Eastern Pacific Hurricane Center was the primary warning center for tropical cyclones in the eastern Pacific Ocean. The season officially started May 15, 1987, in the eastern Pacific, and June 1, 1987, in the central Pacific, and lasted until November 30, 1987. These dates conventionally delimit the period of each year when the vast majority of tropical cyclones form in the northeastern Pacific Ocean.

Despite there being 20 named systems, five above the average, only four storms directly affected land. Hurricane Eugene was the first Pacific hurricane to make landfall in Mexico in July since the 1954 season and caused three deaths and $142.12 million damage. Tropical Storm Pilar and Hurricane Norma also came close to land, with the former producing record rain in Baja California Sur. The remnants of Hurricanes Ramon and Norma caused rain in the Continental United States, with the former responsible for five traffic-related deaths. Elsewhere, Peke was a central north Pacific hurricane that crossed the International Date Line and became a typhoon of the 1987 Pacific typhoon season.

== Seasonal summary ==
Overall, the season continued the general trend in the 1980s of well above-average seasons in the East Pacific. In 1987, there were 20 tropical storms, 10 hurricanes, and four major hurricanes, all were well above average, save the number of major hurricanes which was only slightly above normal. The former made 1987 the fifth most active season on record at that time. Today, 1987 is tied with the 1994 Pacific hurricane season and the 2009 Pacific hurricane season as the sixth most active on record. In the Central Pacific Hurricane Center's area of responsibility, one storm peaked at hurricane strength (Peke) and one peaked as a tropical storm (Oka). Two tropical storms entered this area of responsibility from the east by crossing 140°W.

The season lasted a total 171 days beginning with the formation of Adrian and early June and the dissipation of Tropical Depression Twenty on November 25. There was a total of 924 storms hours and 631 hurricane hours. By comparison, the long-term averages at that time were 161 season days, 875 tropical storm hours, and 664 hurricane hours. A total of 397 advisories were issued, which was below the 1977–1987 average of 428. The hurricane hunters did not fly into any of the storms in 1987. This was also the first year where tropical storm watches and warnings were issued instead of gale watches and warnings for tropical cyclones. 1987 was the last season that the Eastern Pacific Hurricane Center in Redwood City was responsible for forecasting in this basin, a task it had performed since circa 1972. The EPHC was folded into the National Hurricane Center, which took responsibility for the basin starting in the spring of 1988.

Only one tropical storm developed in June. In July, six named storms formed. Out of these storms, Hilary was the only storm to reach major hurricane status. The month of August had a total of five named storms, four of which became hurricanes. However, August did not feature any major hurricanes, though Hurricane Jova came close, peaking as a moderate Category 2. The month of September held the same number of named storms as August, with five named storms. The month also was the carrier of the strongest hurricane on record at that time (that had its intensity estimated from satellite imagery), Hurricane Max, a strong Category 4 hurricane. Hurricane Norma was a Category 1 hurricane on the Saffir–Simpson scale, which dissipated to the south of the Baja California Peninsula. The month of October featured only two tropical cyclones. The first system, Ramon, was a Category 4 hurricane.

Very few cyclones this season impacted land. The only landfalling hurricane of the year, Hurricane Eugene was responsible for significantly damaging about 15 sq. mi of fruit crop, where damage estimated were at $2.6 million (1987 USD) In all, damage totaled to about $142 million. Tropical Storm Irwin, paralleled the coast of Mexico, causing flooding near Acapulco. Damage there was totaled at $2.1 million (1987 USD). The remnants of Norma and Pilar produced rain over Baja California Sur. The remnants of Ramon brought extremely heavy rains to the Western United States.

A moderate El Niño was present throughout the season, with water temperatures across the equatorial Central Pacific being 1.6 °C (34.9 °F) above normal. The Pacific Decadal Oscillation (PDO) was in a warm phase during this time period, with estimates placing the PDO at +0.81 °C (33.46 °F).

== Systems ==
=== Tropical Storm Adrian ===
- Tropical storm (SSHWS)
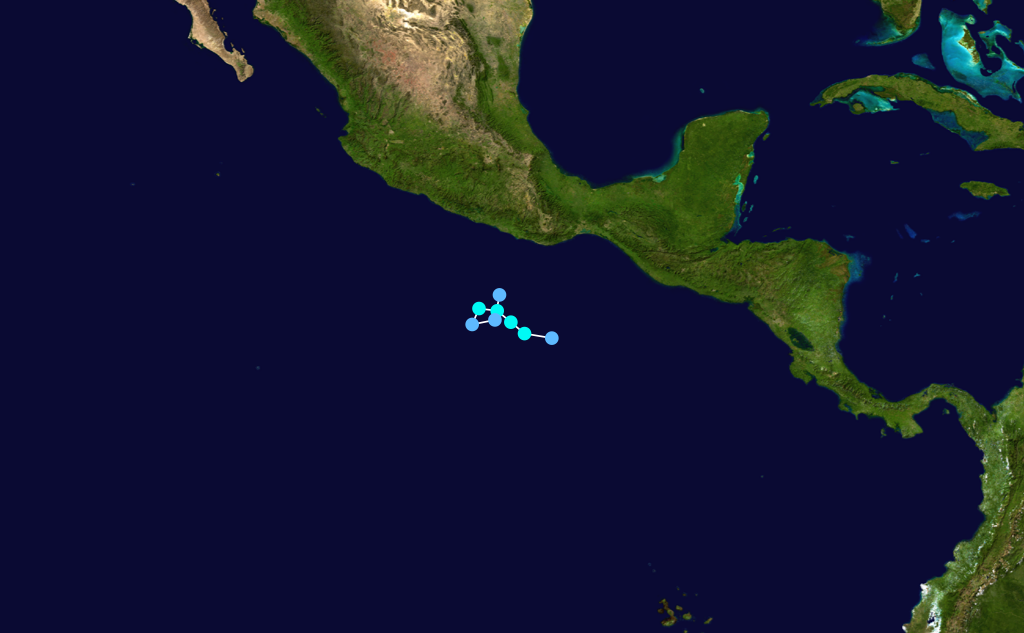
- Duration: June 7 – June 9
- Peak intensity: 45 mph (75 km/h) (1-min);

On June 7, a tropical depression formed 400 mi (645 km) southeast of Acapulco, Mexico. It strengthened into a tropical storm immediately thereafter. After peaking with maximum sustained winds of 45 mph (70 km/h) on June 8, Adrian slowly weakened. It fell to tropical depression status on June 9 and dissipated later that day. During its life, Adrian paralleled the Mexican shoreline far offshore before looping counter-clockwise over its path when it was a depression.

=== Tropical Storm Beatriz ===
- Tropical storm (SSHWS)
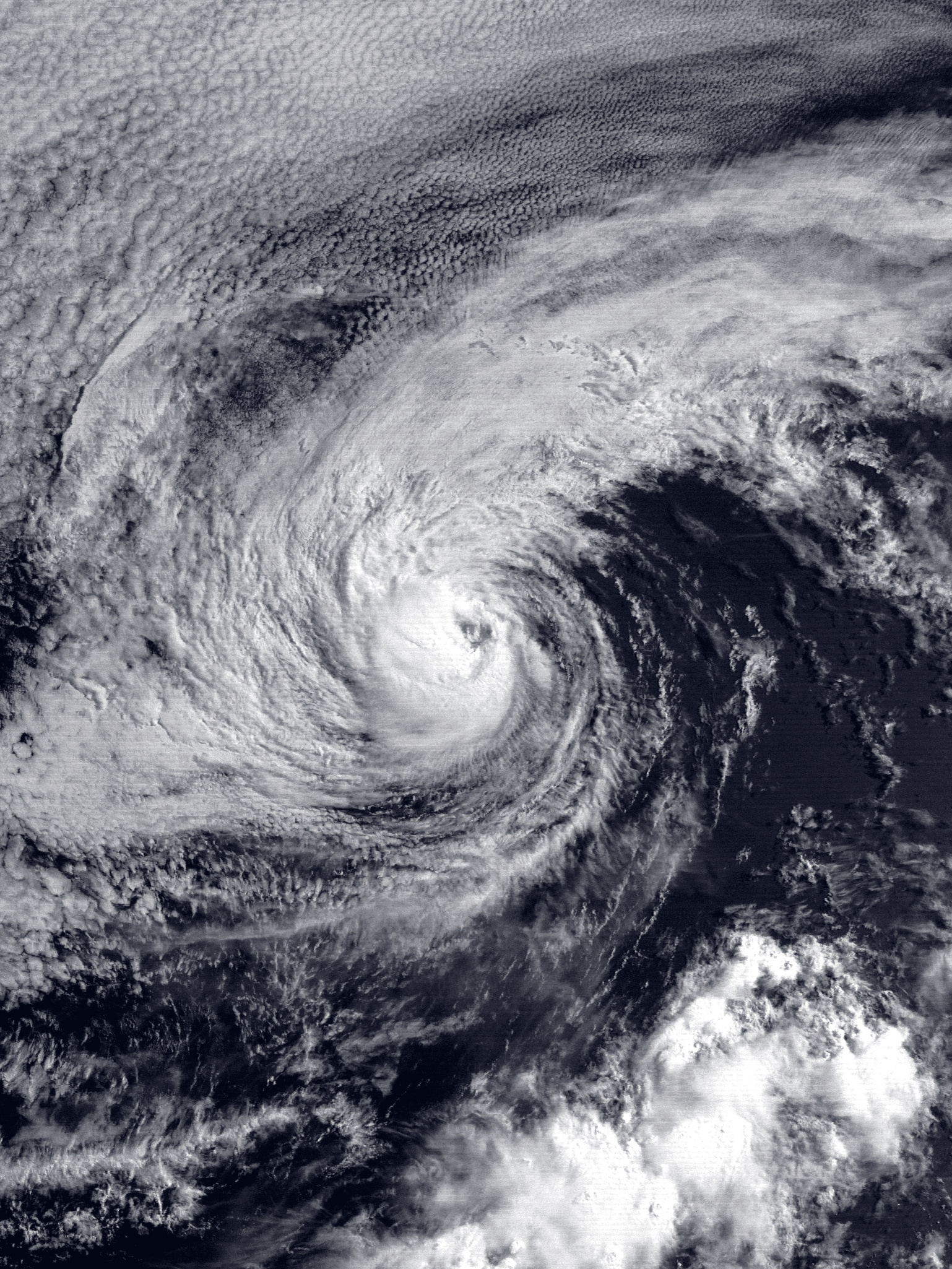
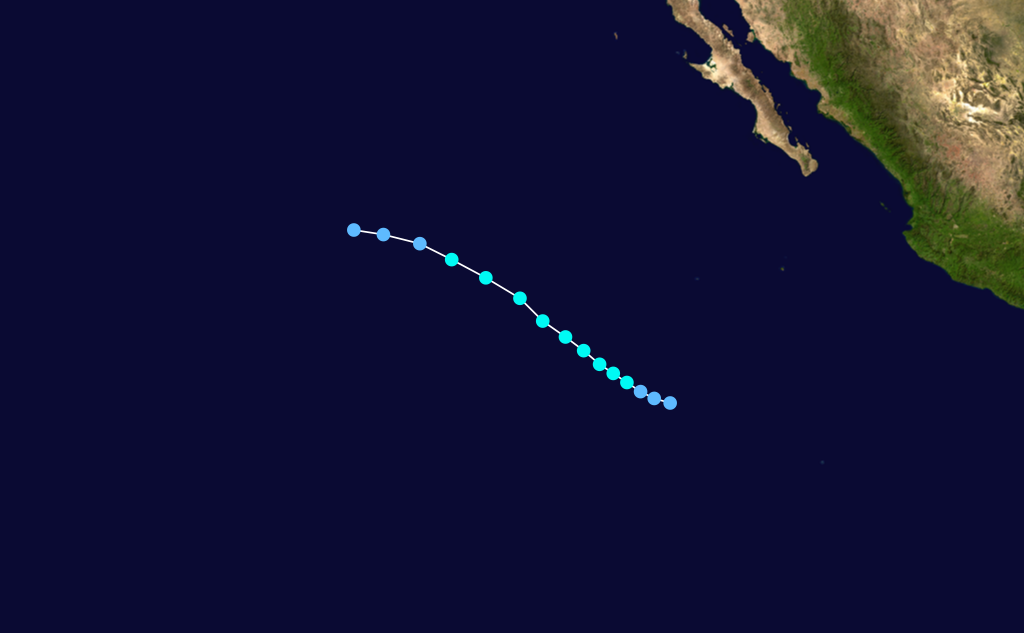
- Duration: July 3 – July 7
- Peak intensity: 50 mph (85 km/h) (1-min);

On July 3, a tropical depression formed 970 mi (1,560 km) south of Cabo San Lucas. It strengthened into a tropical storm later that day. Beatriz slowly strengthened and moved generally northwest as it stayed far offshore. On July 5, Beatriz reached its peak wind speed of 50 mph (80 km/h). It weakened thereafter, falling to a depression on July 6 and dissipating the next day.

=== Tropical Storm Calvin ===
- Tropical storm (SSHWS)
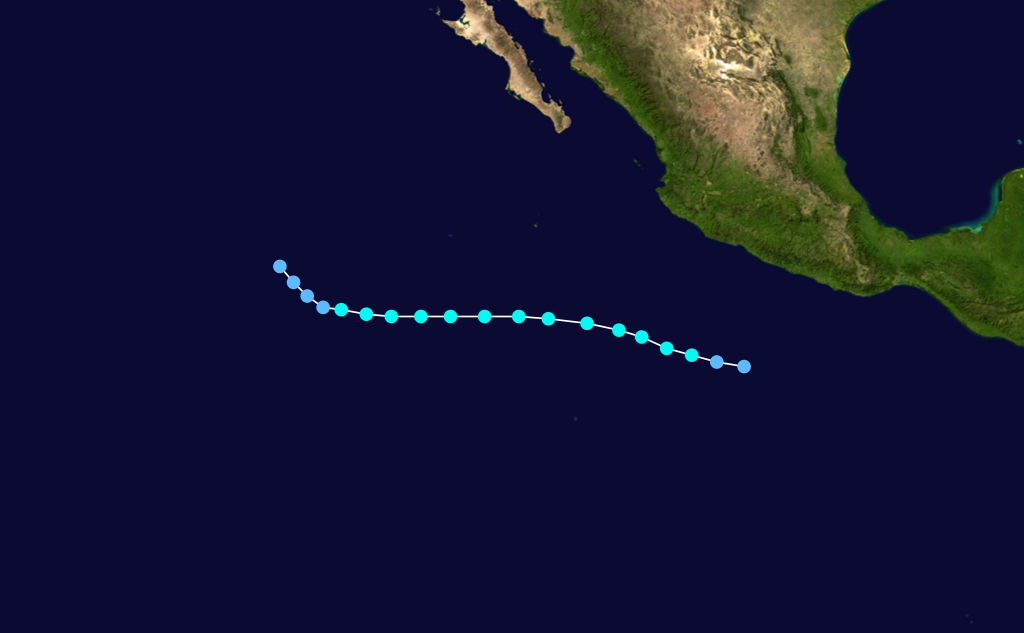
- Duration: July 5 – July 10
- Peak intensity: 65 mph (100 km/h) (1-min);

A tropical depression formed 310 mi (500 km) south of Mexico on July 5 and immediately strengthened into a tropical storm the next day. Calvin headed generally east. On July 8, as a strong tropical storm. It then gradually weakened, falling to a depression on July 9 and dissipated the next day while located 440 mi (710 km) southwest of Cabo San Lucas.

=== Tropical Storm Dora ===
- Tropical storm (SSHWS)
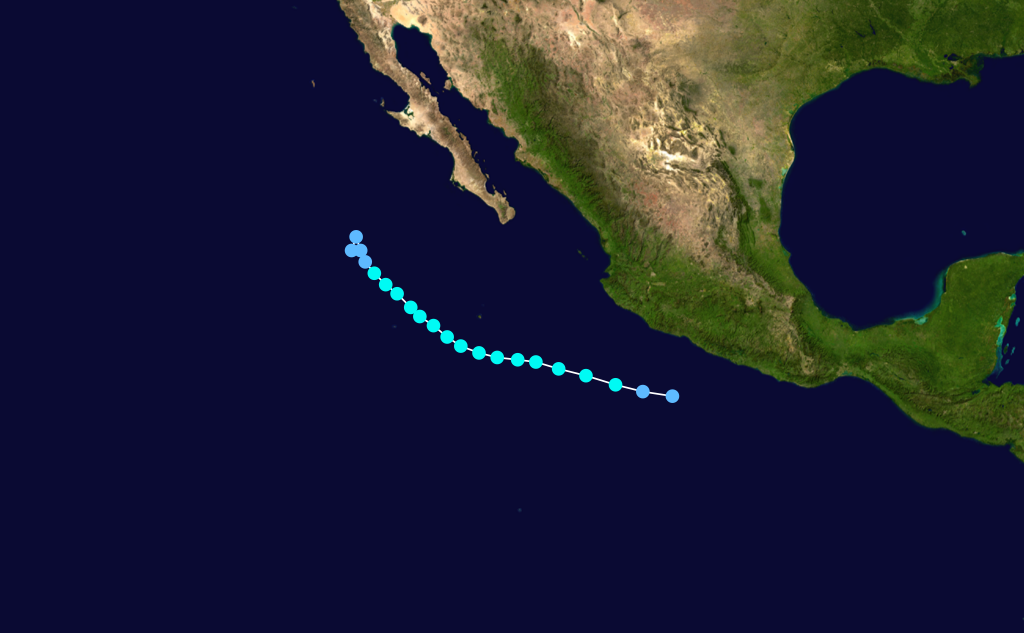
- Duration: July 15 – July 20
- Peak intensity: 60 mph (95 km/h) (1-min);

A tropical depression that had organized on July 15 while located 710 mi (1,140 km) south of Cabo San Lucas. The depression strengthened into a tropical storm that same day while located around 215 mi (345 km) west of Acapulco. Dora headed west-northwest and slowly strengthened. It reached its peak winds of 60 mph (95 km/h) on July 17. It then steadily weakened, becoming a depression two days later. Dora dissipated on July 20 while located 500 mi (805 km) west of Cabo San Lucas.

=== Hurricane Eugene ===
- Category 2 hurricane (SSHWS)
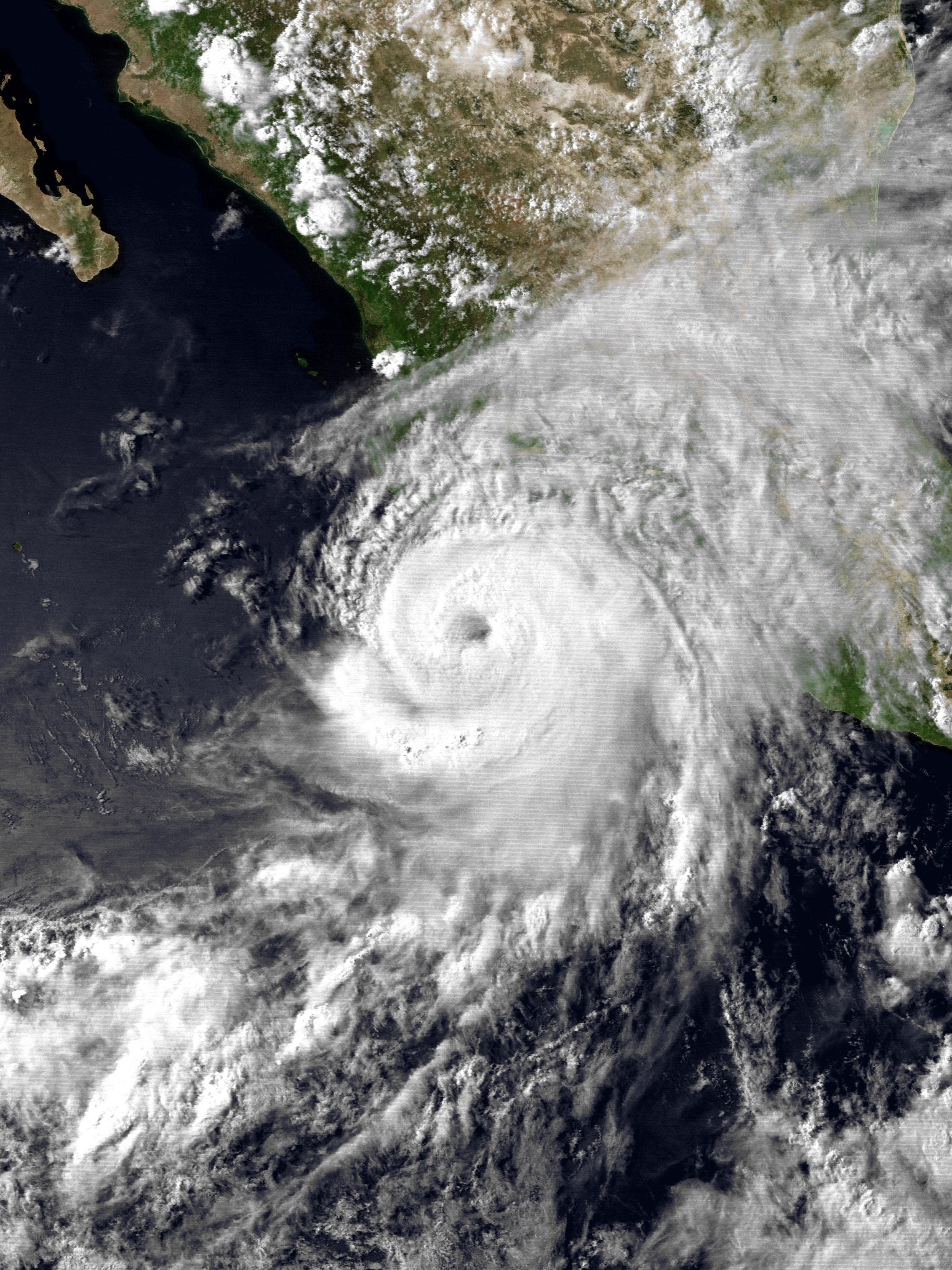
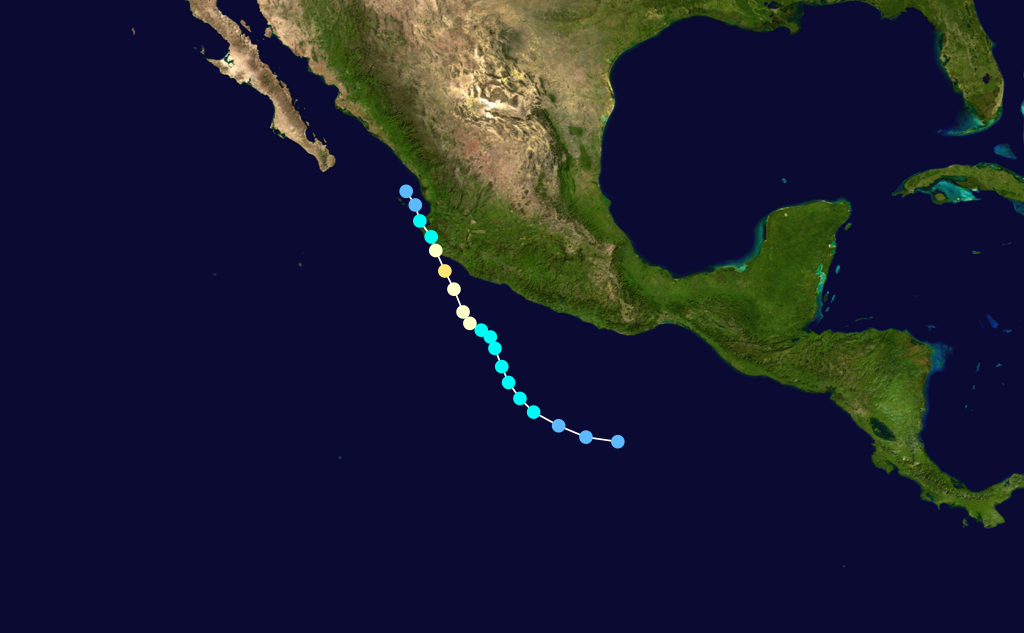
- Duration: July 22 – July 26
- Peak intensity: 100 mph (155 km/h) (1-min);

A tropical disturbance developed into a tropical depression on July 22 near the coast of Mexico. It initially headed westward and strengthened into a tropical storm the same day it formed. It strengthened into a hurricane, the first of the season, on July 24 as an upper-level cyclone pulled the system north. After peaking as a low-end Category 2 hurricane on July 25, land interaction weakened the hurricane to Category 1 as it made landfall west of Manzanillo. The rough topography weakened Eugene, and the hurricane was only a depression when it emerged into the Gulf of California. It promptly dissipated on July 26.

When the storm first posed a threat to Mexico on July 24, the port of Zinuhuatenjo was closed for small craft. Operation classes were suspended in Acapulco. In Manzanillo, the port was officially closed down. The Mexican navy was put on alert for a total distance of 945 mi (1,520 km). The weather service issued navigation warnings for three coastal states and ships were urged to maintain contact with officials. Hurricane Eugene caused extremely heavy rain in coastal parts of Mexico. The highest rain was 20.68 inches at Aquila, Michoacán. The system was responsible for the highest tropical cyclone caused rainfall in five Mexican states. Over 5,000 people were displaced. In Manzanillo alone, at least 60 people were rendered homeless. Most of the damage was the scattering of debris and mud. Six people were injured, and a man in Venustiano Carrazano was killed when a palm tree was blown over. In all, three fatalities were reported. The hurricane destroyed about 15 sq. mi (39 km^{2}) of fruit crop in the country, amounting to more than $2.6 million in damage (1987 USD). Additionally, damage to eight beach houses totaled to $120,000. Total crop damage reached $142 million (1987 USD); In the aftermath of the storm, the navy and army and local government devised a cleanup plan. They worked quickly to restore water and power service, and within a few days the services had been restored for most of the impacted area.

=== Tropical Storm Fernanda ===
- Tropical storm (SSHWS)
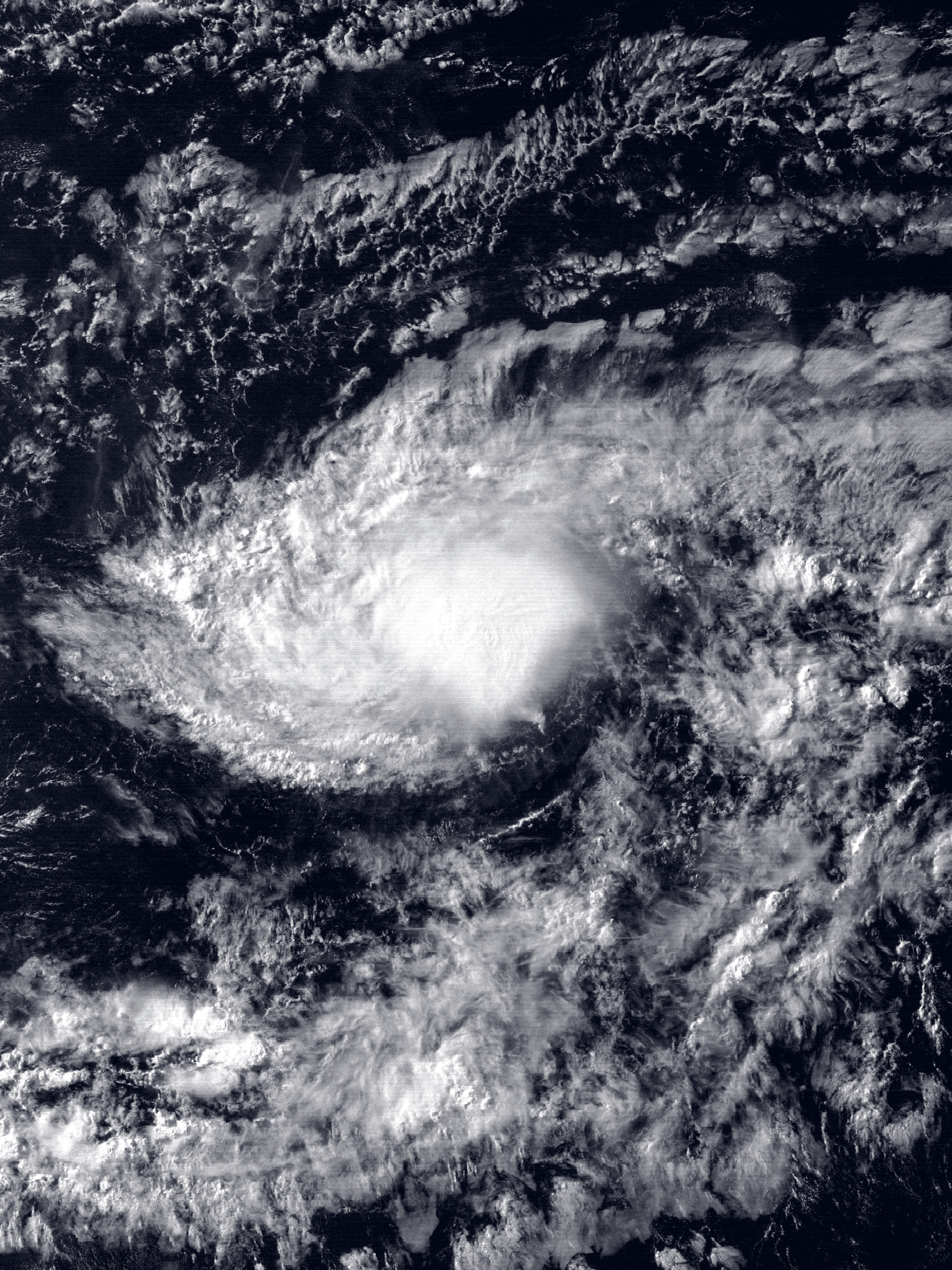
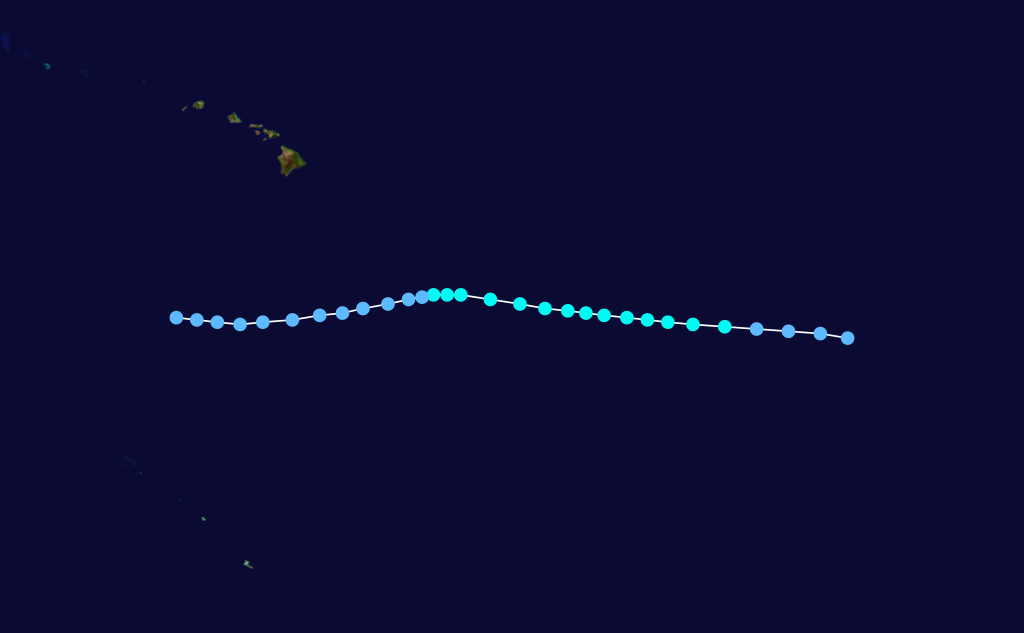
- Duration: July 24 – July 31
- Peak intensity: 65 mph (100 km/h) (1-min);

At a location more westerly than typical for eastern Pacific hurricanes, Tropical Depression Nine-E formed on July 24. Heading west, the cyclone reached tropical storm intensity on July 25. Fernanda strengthened and reached its peak strength near hurricane status on July 26, the same day it crossed 140°W and entered the central north Pacific. Fernanda headed in the general direction of the Hawaiian Islands as a trough approached. The trough caused wind shear, which weakened the cyclone into a tropical depression on July 28. Fernanda dissipated three days later.

=== Hurricane Greg ===
- Category 1 hurricane (SSHWS)
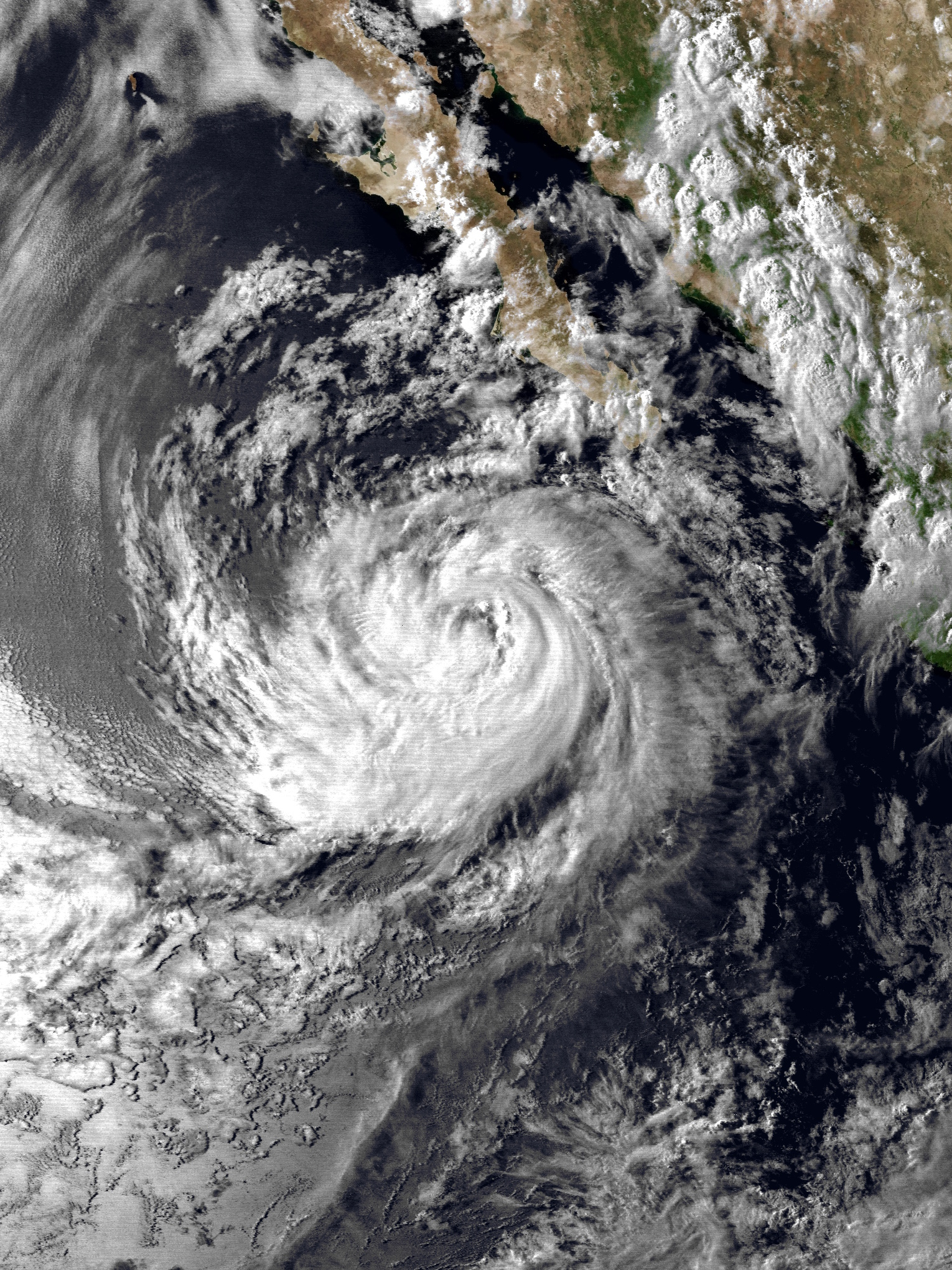
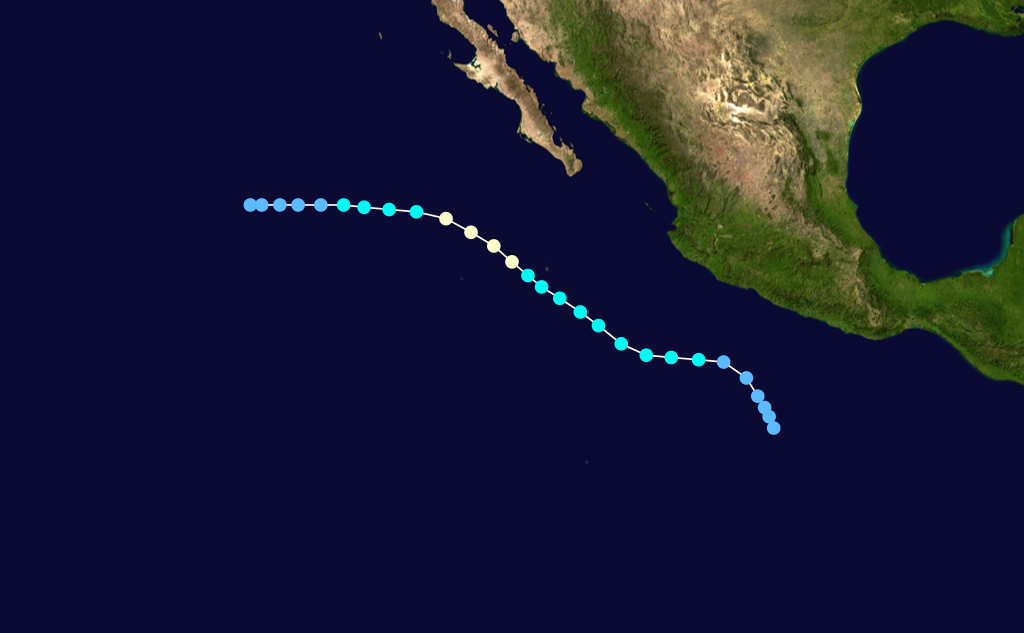
- Duration: July 28 – August 3
- Peak intensity: 80 mph (130 km/h) (1-min);

A tropical wave left the coast of Panama on July 26. It organized into Tropical Depression Ten on July 28 while located 800 mi (1,300 km) and it strengthened into a tropical storm the day after the system formed. Over 84 °F (29 °C) water, the cyclone steadily intensified as it roughly paralleled the Mexican coast while remaining far offshore. Greg became a hurricane on 1800 UTC July 31 and peaked with wind speeds of 80 mph (130 kmh) on August 1. It then weakened as it moved over cooler water, falling to tropical storm intensity later on August 1. At this time, Greg was located 570 mi (915 km) away from Baja California. It then weakened into depression intensity on August 2, and completely dissipated the next day. Greg affected Mexico a few weeks after Eugene did, resulting in additional flooding. Due to both storms, the region registered rainfall amounts for times the average.

=== Hurricane Hilary ===
- Category 3 hurricane (SSHWS)
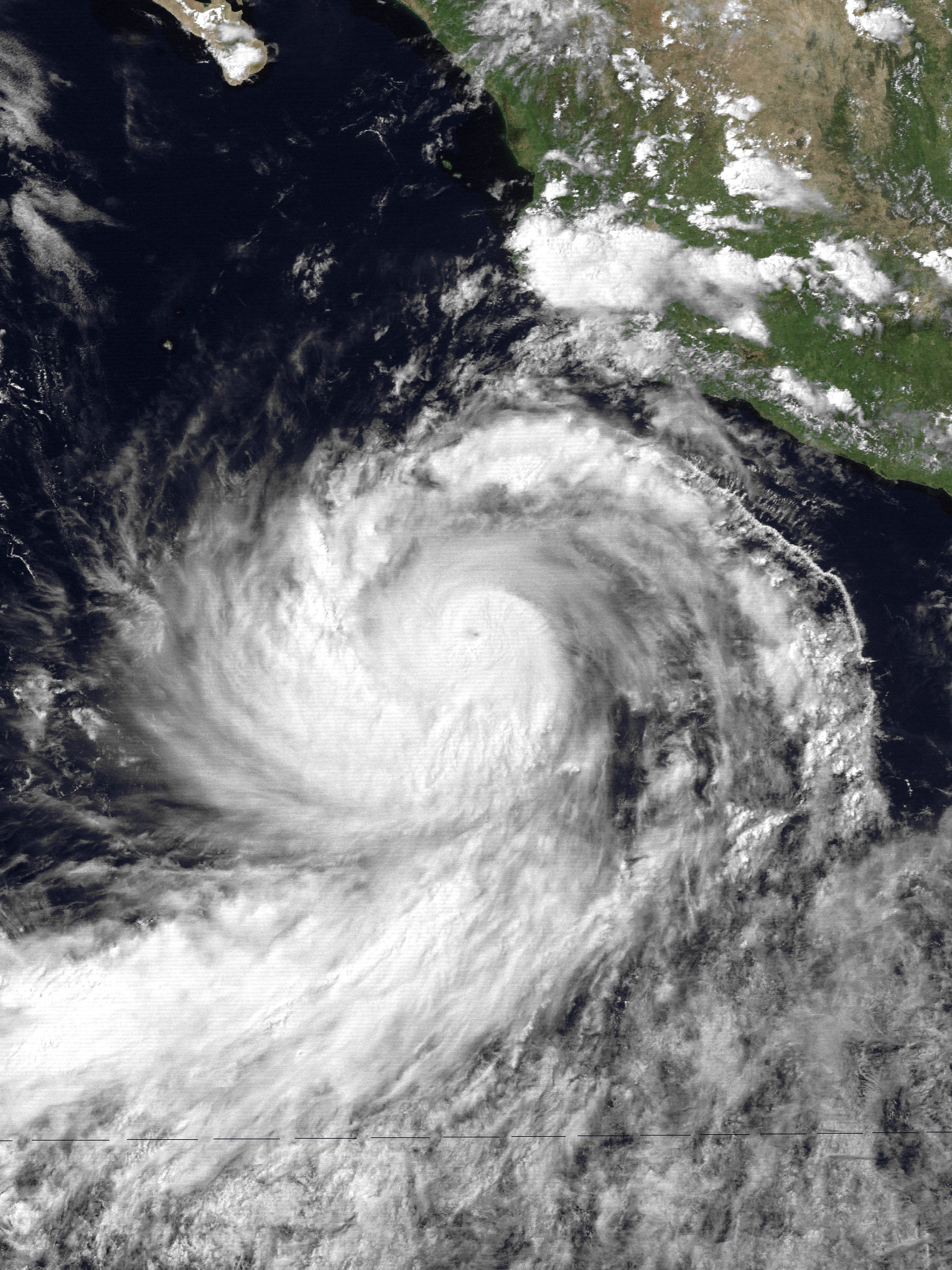
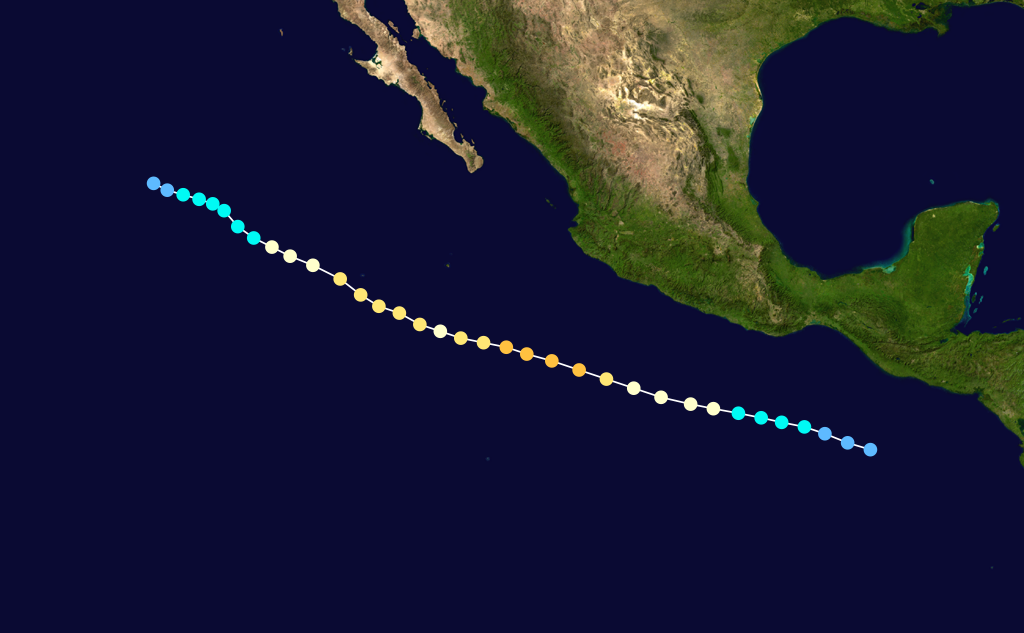
- Duration: July 31 – August 9
- Peak intensity: 120 mph (195 km/h) (1-min);

A tropical wave moved through Central America on July 30 and July 31. Steered by a large deep-layer ridge that extended as far southwest as Hawaii and as far northeast as Oklahoma, the wave moved steadily west-northwest. Thunderstorm activity increased considerably after 00:00 UTC on July 31. A tropical depression formed at 18:00 UTC on July 31 while located 775 mi (1,245 km) south of Cabo San Lucas. The cyclone strengthened at a steady pace and reached hurricane intensity on August 1. Hilary continued strengthening, and became a hurricane on August 2. On August 3, the cyclone reached Category 3 status on the Saffir–Simpson scale, making it the first major hurricane of the season. At its peak strength, which it reached on August 4, Hilary attained winds of 120 mph (195 km/h). It then weakened, and had fallen to Category 1 intensity on August 5. The hurricane then restrengthened, maintaining Category 2 intensity until August 6. The system then began a terminal weakening trend. By August 7 it was only a tropical storm. After falling to depression strength, Hilary dissipated on August 9 over 21 °C (70 °F) waters. In Southern California, officials hoped that Hilary would produce a major increase in waves in time for a surfing tournament finals, though only a small increase in wave action was expected.

=== Tropical Storm Irwin ===
- Tropical storm (SSHWS)
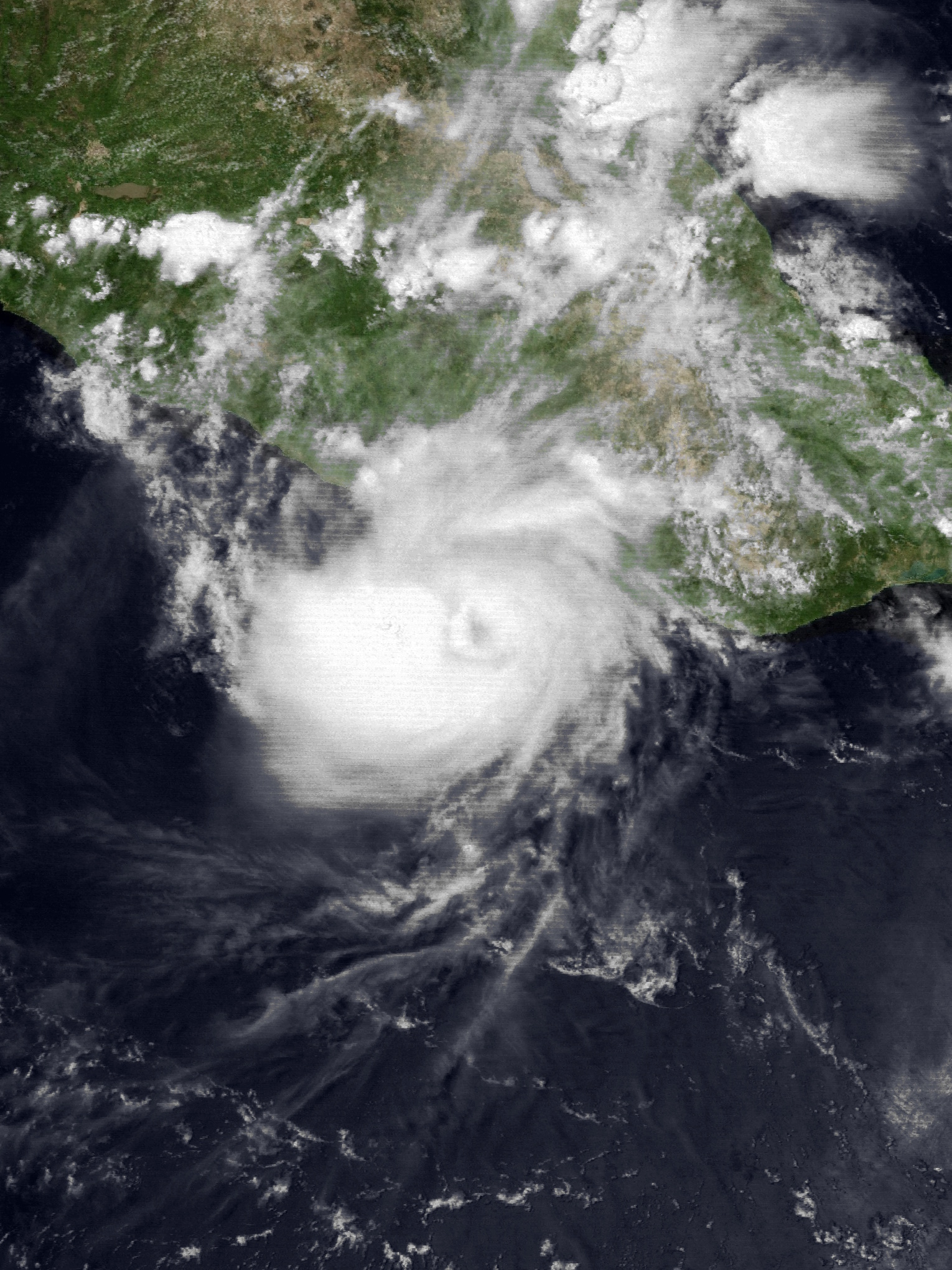
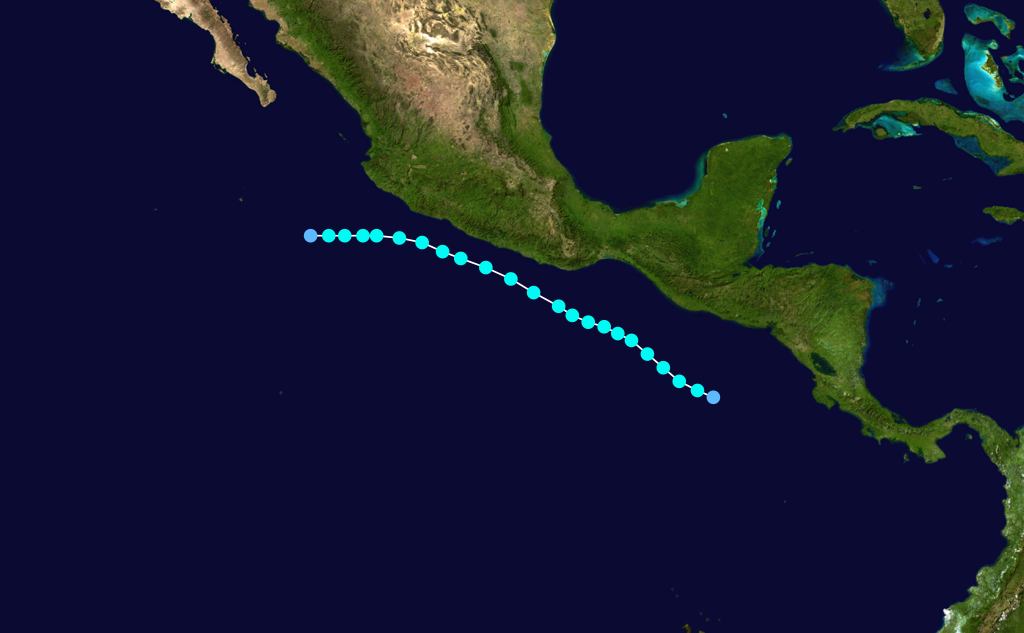
- Duration: August 3 – August 9
- Peak intensity: 65 mph (100 km/h) (1-min);

A tropical depression formed on August 3 over 1,000 mi (1,610 km) south of Manzanillo. The depression quickly intensified into a tropical storm. Irwin fluctuated in strength as it closely paralleled the coast of Mexico. On August 6, Irwin reached its maximum winds of 65 mph (105 km/h); it maintained that velocity for over two days. During August 8, Irwin turned nearly due west and headed out to sea. Irwin weakened to a tropical depression on August 9 and immediately dissipated. Forecasters at one point in time noted the possibility of the storm impacting California. In addition, the storm produced heavy rainfall in Mexico, causing $2.1 million in damage. Although many businesses and homes received damage, no deaths were reported.

=== Hurricane Jova ===
- Category 2 hurricane (SSHWS)
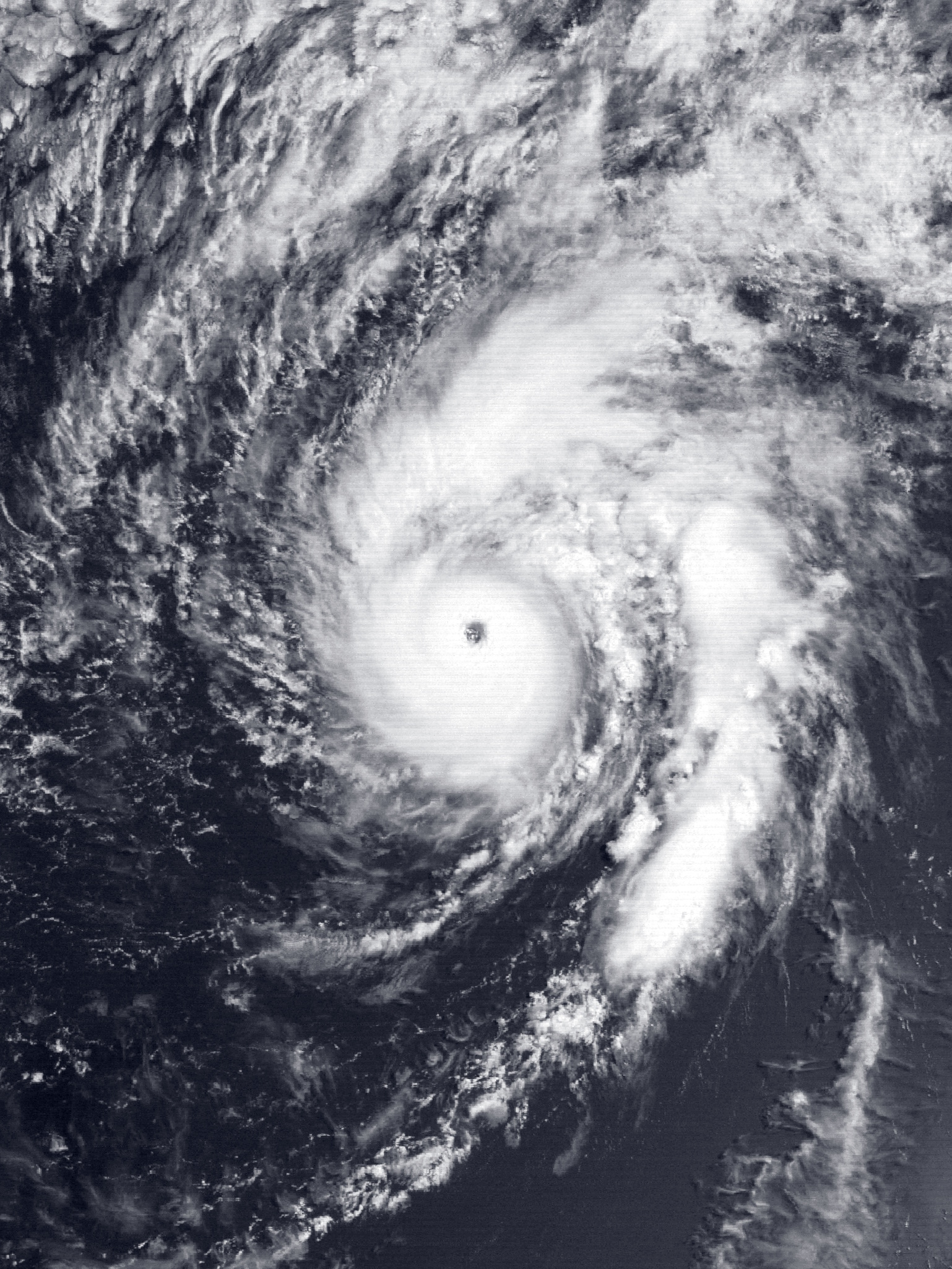
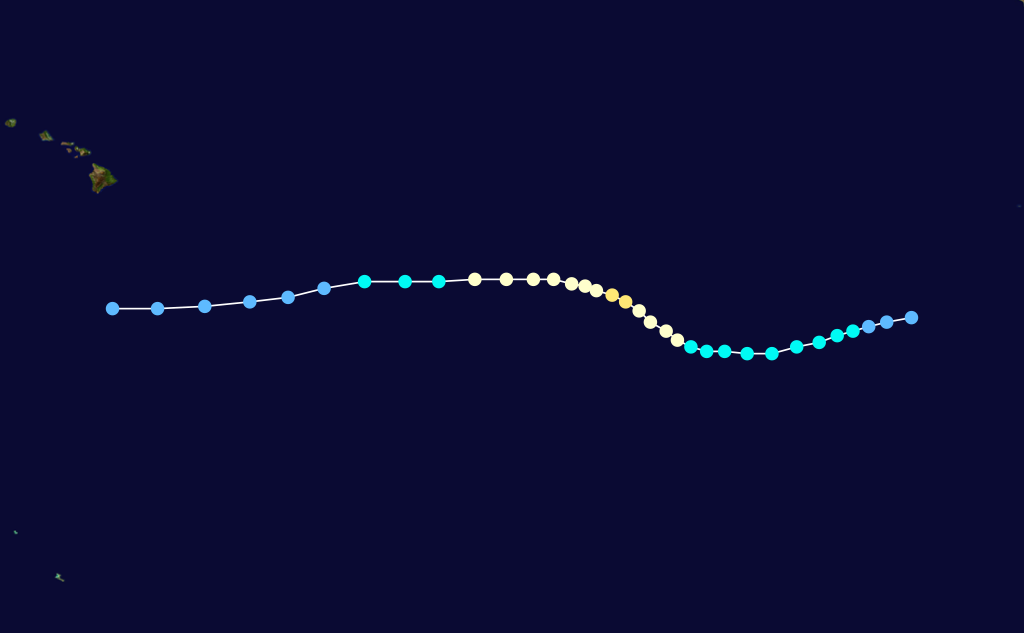
- Duration: August 13 – August 22
- Peak intensity: 105 mph (165 km/h) (1-min);

A tropical depression formed on August 13, while located 1,095 mi (1,760 km) south-southeast from Baja California Sur. The cyclone intensified into Tropical Storm Jova the next day. The depression initially moved to the west-southwest due to a ridge north of the system. It slowly strengthened and reached hurricane intensity on 1800 UTC August 16. The intensifying hurricane then turned west-northwest. When it peaked on August 17, Jova was a moderate Category 2 hurricane. After peaking, Jova slowly weakened as it turned westbound. It was in a moderately declining state when it crossed 140°W and entered the Central Pacific Hurricane Center's area of responsibility. Jova continued to weaken, and was a depression by August 20. Jova dissipated two days later while due south of the Big Island of Hawaii over 70 °F (21 °C) water, although it remnants were still visible south of Johnston Atoll until at least August 24. Jova generated heavy surf for a few days in Southern California.

=== Tropical Storm Oka ===
- Tropical storm (SSHWS)
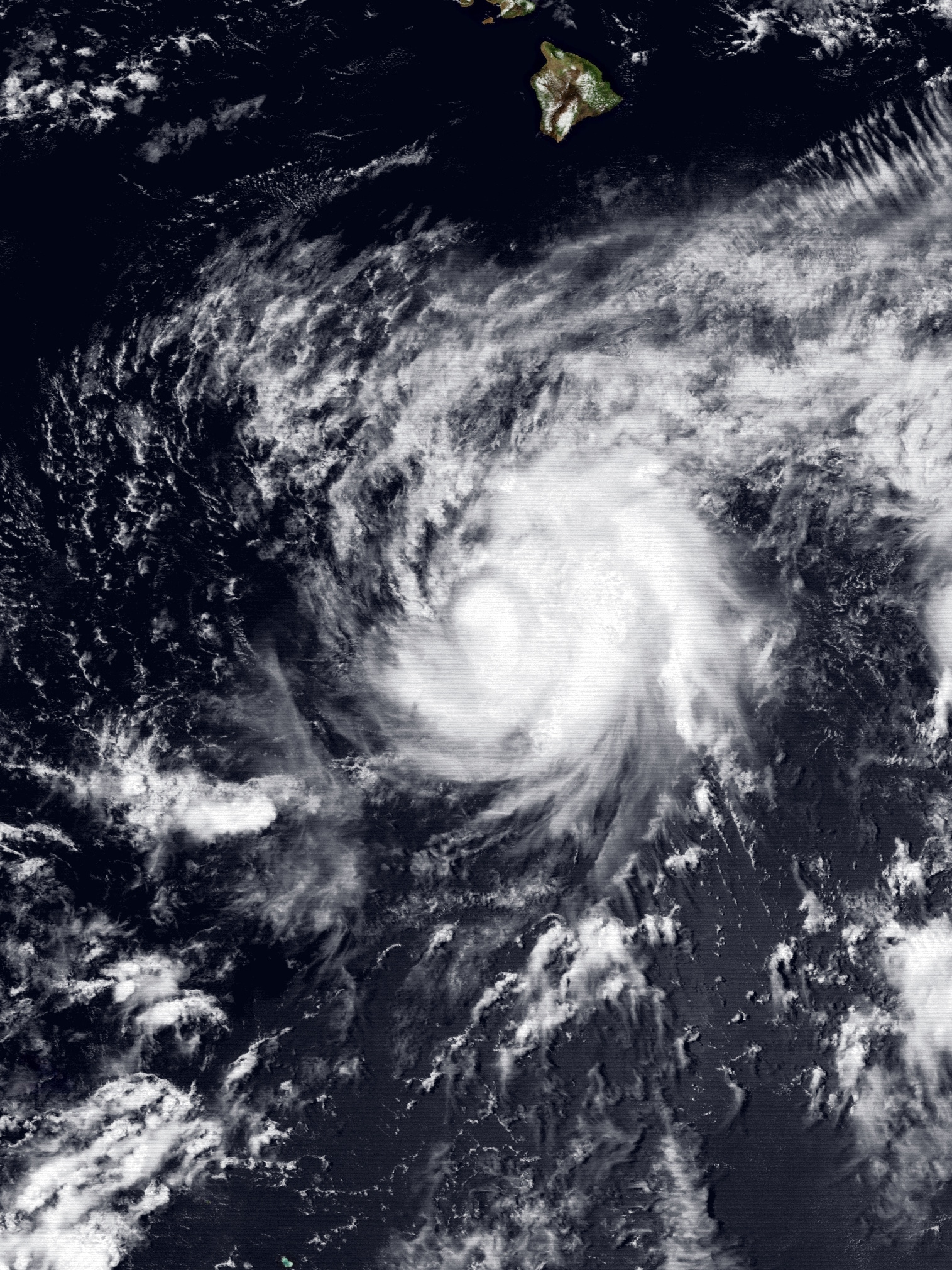
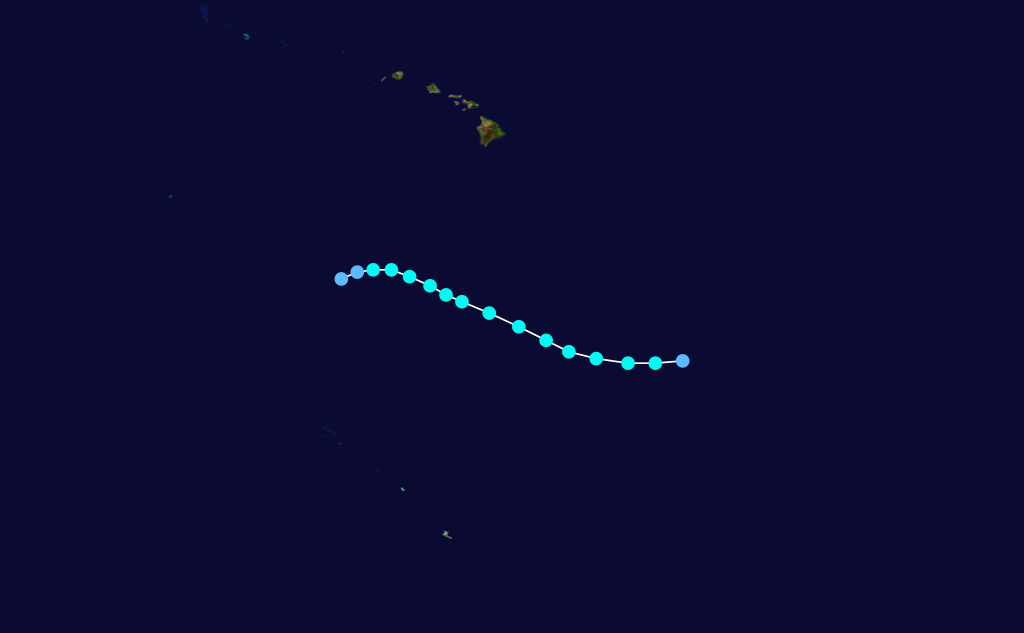
- Duration: August 26 – August 29
- Peak intensity: 60 mph (95 km/h) (1-min);

A disturbance in the Intertropical Convergence Zone organized into Tropical Depression One-C on August 26. Twelve hours later, it was upgraded to a tropical storm and named Oka, which is Hawaiian for Oscar. Oka slowly moved west-northwest and reached its peak wind speed of 60 mph (95 kmh) on August 27. The next day, a nearby trough caused wind shear, which weakened Oka to a depression on August 29 and subsequently destroyed it.

=== Tropical Storm Knut ===
- Tropical storm (SSHWS)
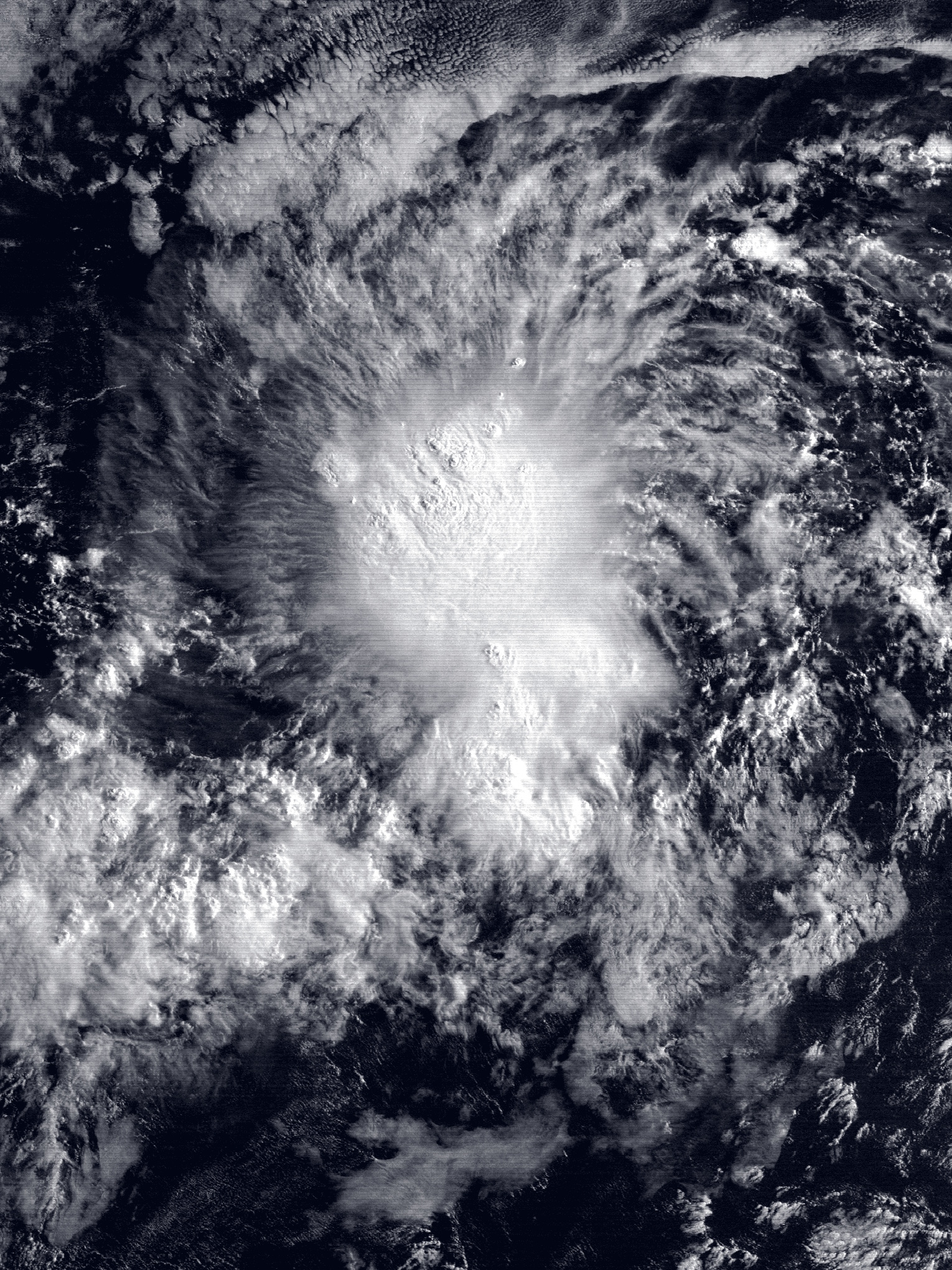
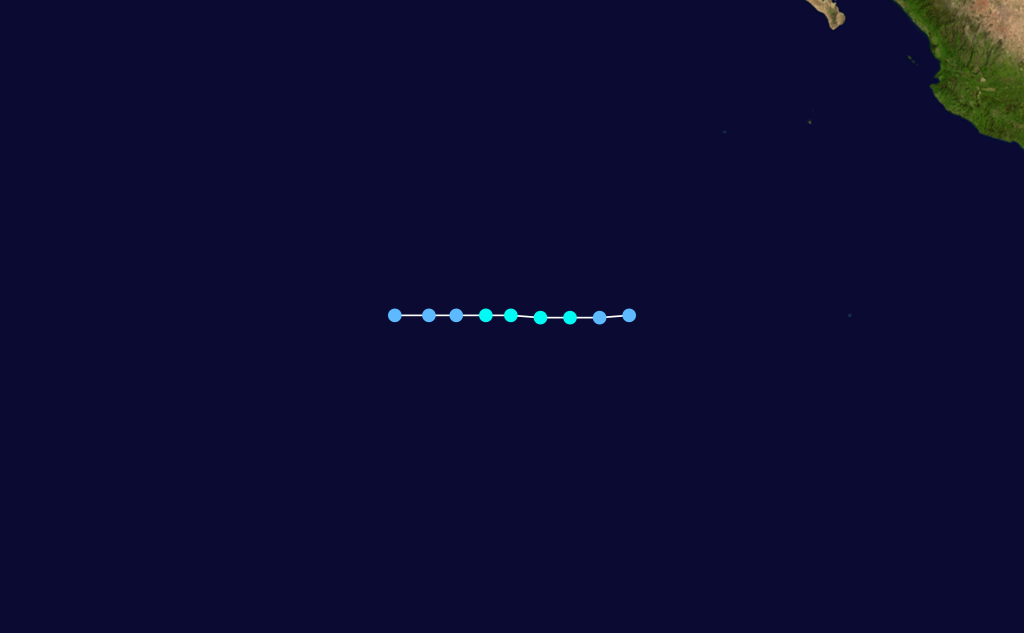
- Duration: August 28 – August 30
- Peak intensity: 40 mph (65 km/h) (1-min);

On August 28, a tropical depression formed 1,165 mi (1,875 km) west Manzanillo, Mexico. Twelve hours later, it strengthened into a tropical storm and was named Knut. Never attaining winds stronger than 40 mph (65 kmh), Knut stayed a tropical storm for one day. It weakened to a tropical depression on August 30 and dissipated later that day. The cyclone stayed out at sea for its entire life, and never threatened land.

=== Hurricane Lidia ===
- Category 1 hurricane (SSHWS)
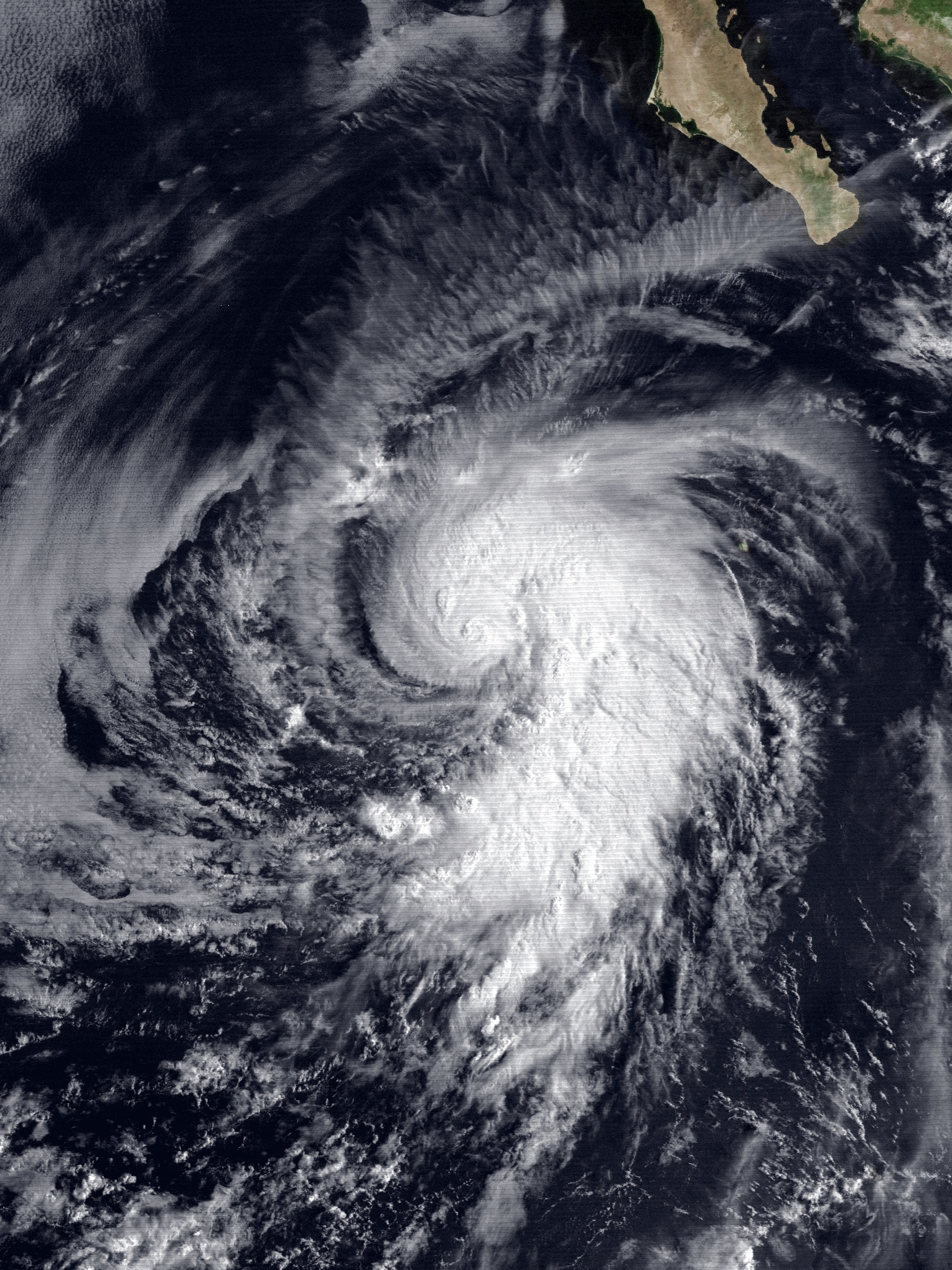
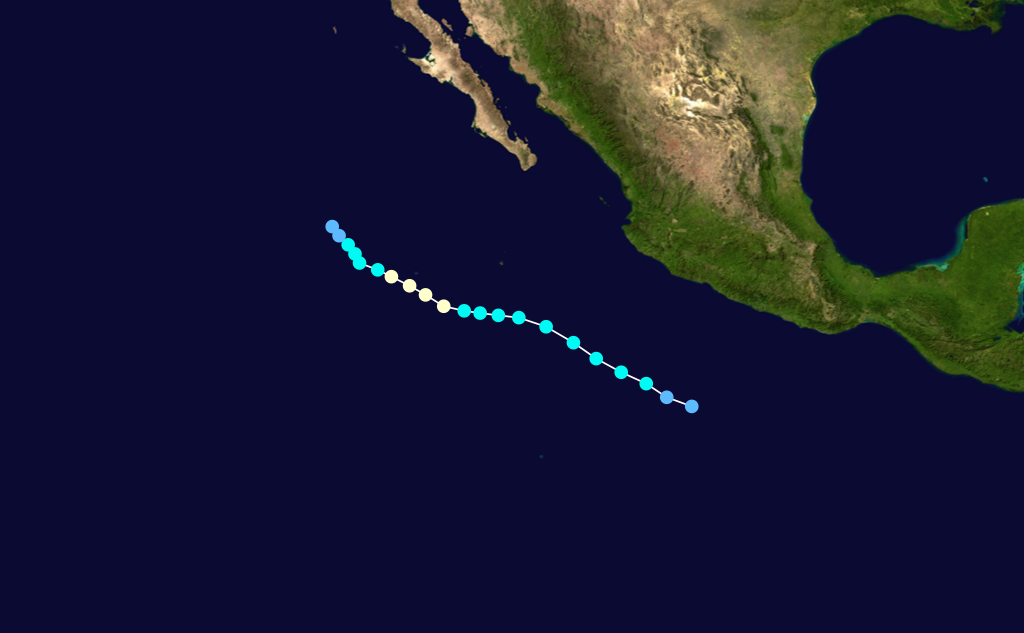
- Duration: August 29 – September 3
- Peak intensity: 85 mph (140 km/h) (1-min);

Lidia originated from a disturbance that entered the basin on August 28. It remained south of the Mexican coast in an area of warm sea surface temperatures, and at 1800 UTC August 29, Tropical Depression Fifteen formed. It intensified into a tropical storm six hours after development about 860 mi (1,385 km) away from Baja California Sur. Lidia moved northwest, paralleling the Mexican coast. It edged in a more westerly direction for a day before resuming its northwesterly path, and reached hurricane intensity on 0600 UTC September 1. At its strongest on September 1 based on intensity estimates via Dvorak classifications, Hurricane Lidia had a wind speed of 85 mph (135 km/h). Shortly thereafter, Lidia began weakening and lost hurricane intensity on September 2. Lidia weakened very rapidly over cold water. Early the next day, Lidia weakened to a tropical depression and dissipated over 76 °F (24 °C) waters on 1200 UTC September 3. The remnants of the storm; however, brought showers to California. One woman was injured by a lightning strike.

=== Hurricane Max ===
- Category 4 hurricane (SSHWS)
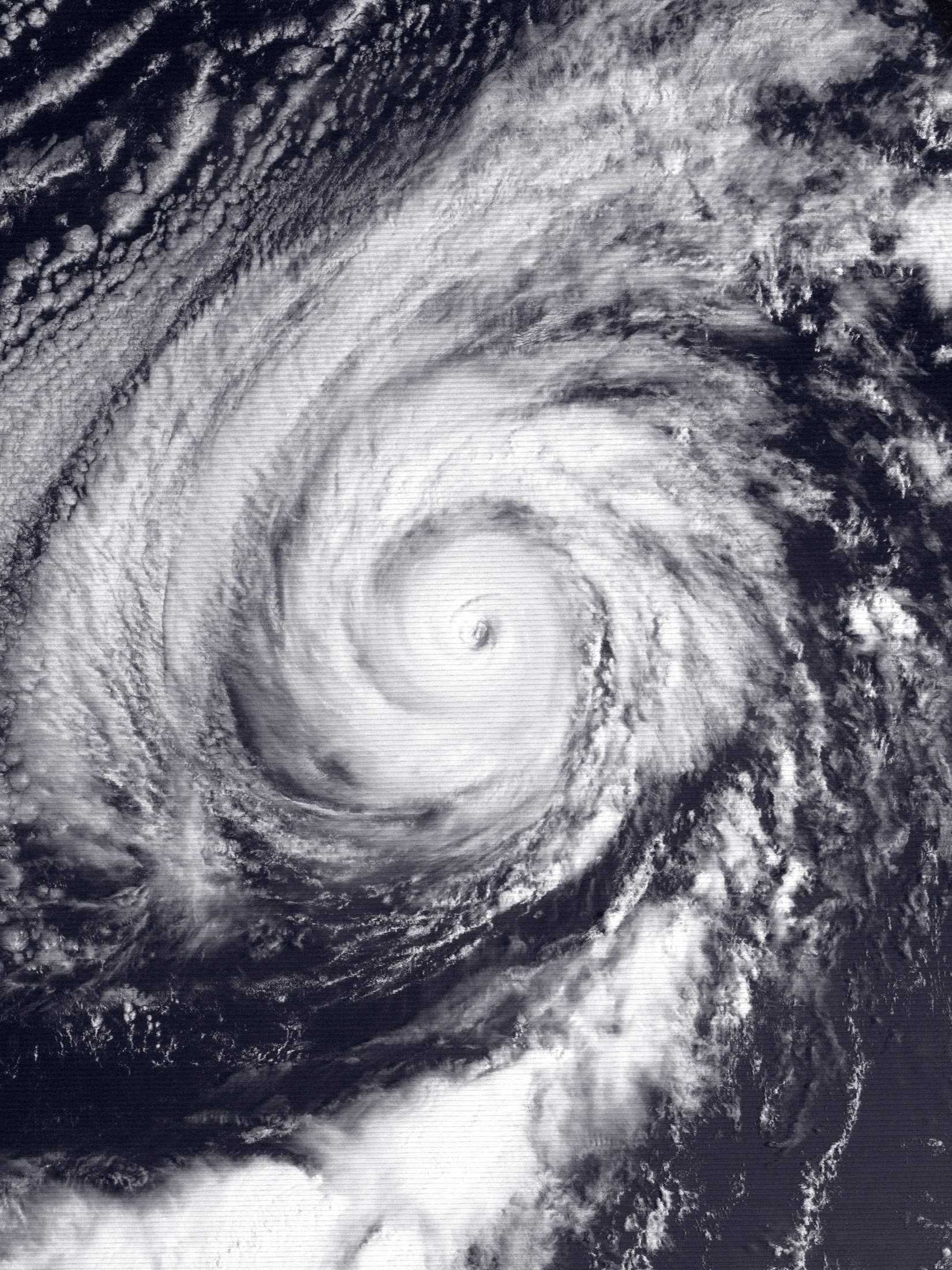
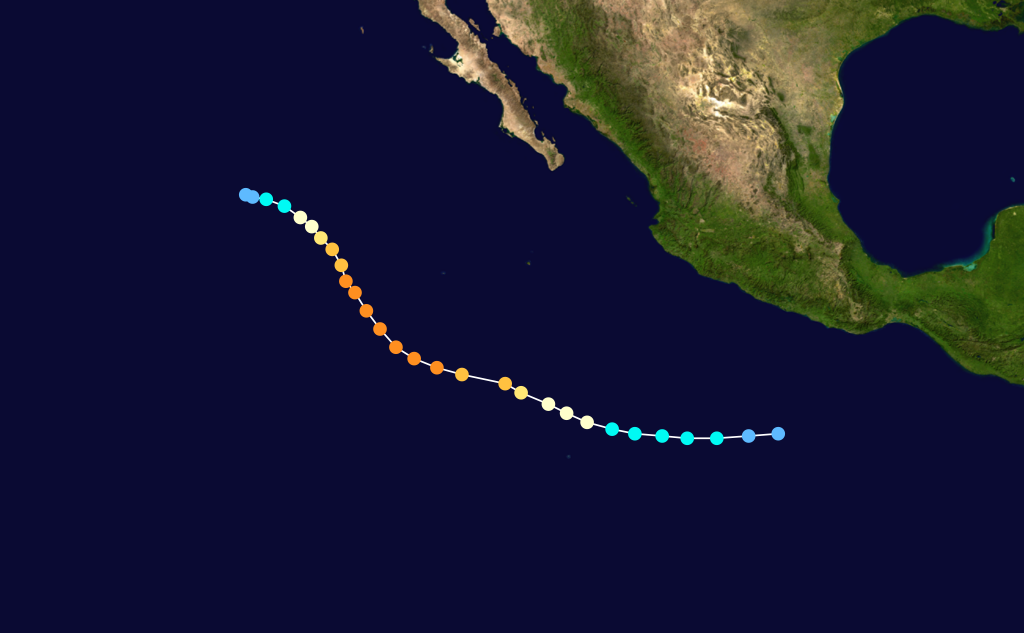
- Duration: September 9 – September 16
- Peak intensity: 155 mph (250 km/h) (1-min);

A tropical disturbance left Central America on September 8. At 1200 UTC on September 9, a tropical depression formed over the warm waters south of the Gulf of Tehuantepec. While located 935 mi (1,505 km) from Cabo San Lucas, the depression intensified into a tropical storm and was named Max. Tracking west-northwest, Max rapidly intensified and became a hurricane on September 11, over a day after it was named. Turning northwest, Max continued to intensify. By September 10, the cyclone reached Category 2 intensity, and became a major hurricane several hours later. On September 12, Hurricane Max reached Category 4 intensity. The cyclone reached its maximum windspeed of 155 mph (250 km/h) on September 13. Around that time, a then-record was set for the highest satellite estimates for a Pacific hurricane. Dvorak classifications—used to estimate a tropical cyclone's intensity—were at T7.0/160 mph (255 km/h), the highest ever recorded in the basin, though this was later matched by hurricanes Hernan and Trudy of the 1990 Pacific hurricane season.

Max maintained its intensity for 24 hours. However, the storm crossed the 78 °F (26 °C) isotherm and began to weaken rapidly. The hurricane's track then shifted north for a time, before turning to the west on September 15. That same day, it weakened to a tropical storm. The tropical cyclone dissipated at 1200 UTC September 16 while located 865 mi (1,390 km) north-northeast of Cabo San Lucas. The hurricane was predicted to cause 8 ft (2.4 m) waves in Southern California, though Max was well past its peak at that time.

=== Hurricane Norma ===
- Category 1 hurricane (SSHWS)
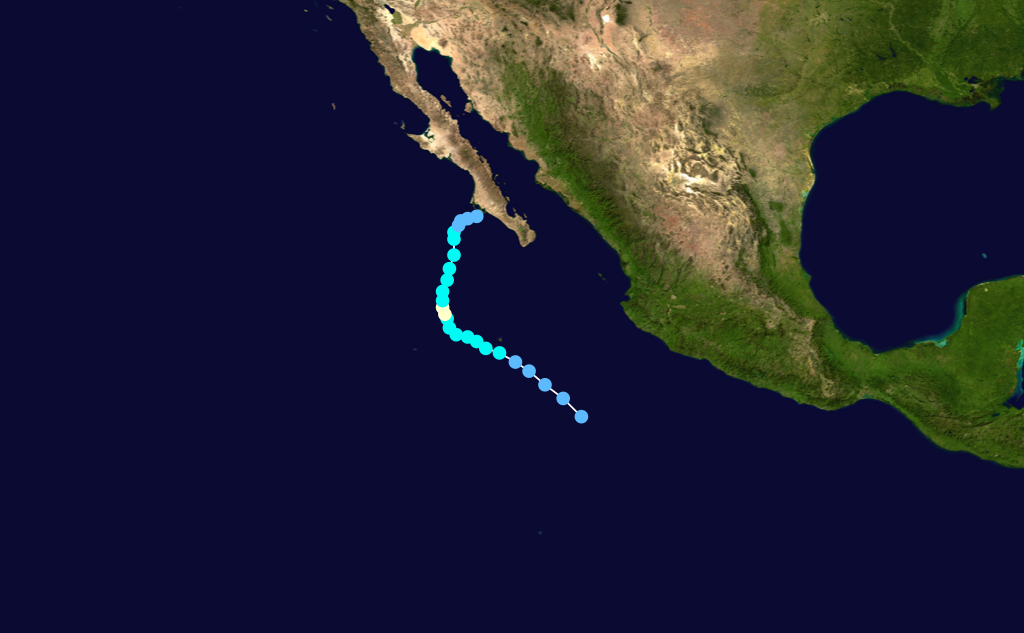
- Duration: September 14 – September 20
- Peak intensity: 75 mph (120 km/h) (1-min);

A tropical disturbance developed on September 13 while located 340 mi (550 km) southwest of Acapulco. Moving northwest, a depression formed on September 14 far from land. It took over 24 hours to reach tropical storm strength. Norma paralleled the coast far offshore. The storm steadily intensified over 84 °F (29 °C) sea surface temperatures. On September 17, Norma turned to the north, and became a minimal hurricane for 12 hours as an eye became visible on infrared imagery. Norma turned northbound toward land. However, Norma remained offshore due weak southwesterly flow from a cutoff low located west of Baja California Sur. The cyclone stalled and then edged slightly east when it weakened back into a depression on September 19. Tropical Depression Norma dissipated a mere 95 mi (155 km) south of the Baja California Peninsula; it never made landfall.

Prior to the remains of Hurricane Norma's arrival in the Southwestern United States, forecasters were anticipating cloudy skies over San Diego. Over the deserts and mountains near the area, there was also a possibility of heavy rainfall. The remnants ultimately caused rainfall and thunderstorms in California on September 22 and September 23. The rainfall totaled to .70 in (18 mm) at Lindbergh Field, and .97 in (25 mm) at Lemon Grove. There were numerous power outages, small fires, some road flooding, and some property damage. In San Diego and southern Orange County, 200,000 homes and business lost power, but the power was quickly restored. However, there are no reports of damage or flooding in Baja California from the storm; the area the tropical cyclone struck was sparsely populated.

=== Hurricane Otis ===
- Category 3 hurricane (SSHWS)
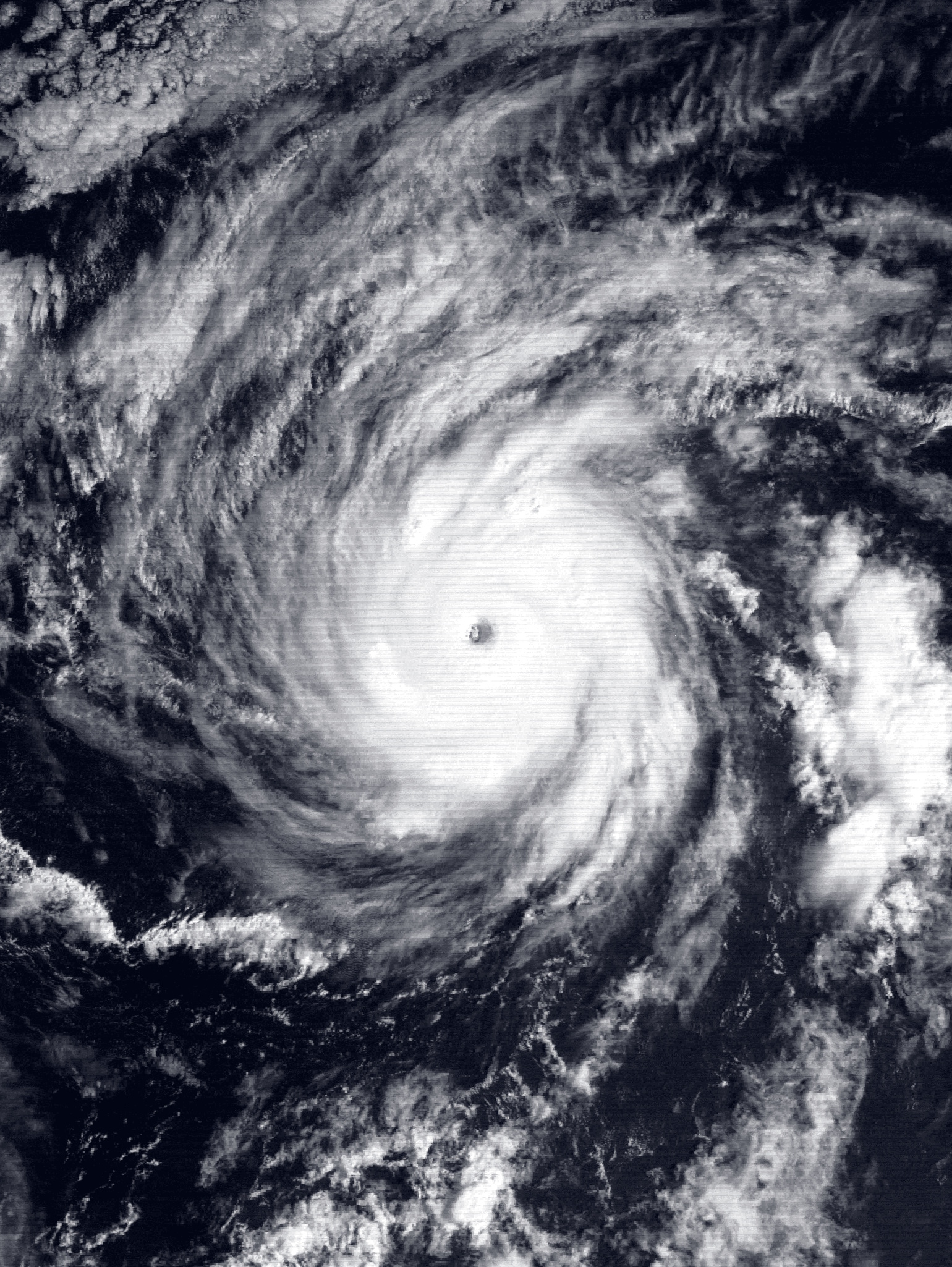
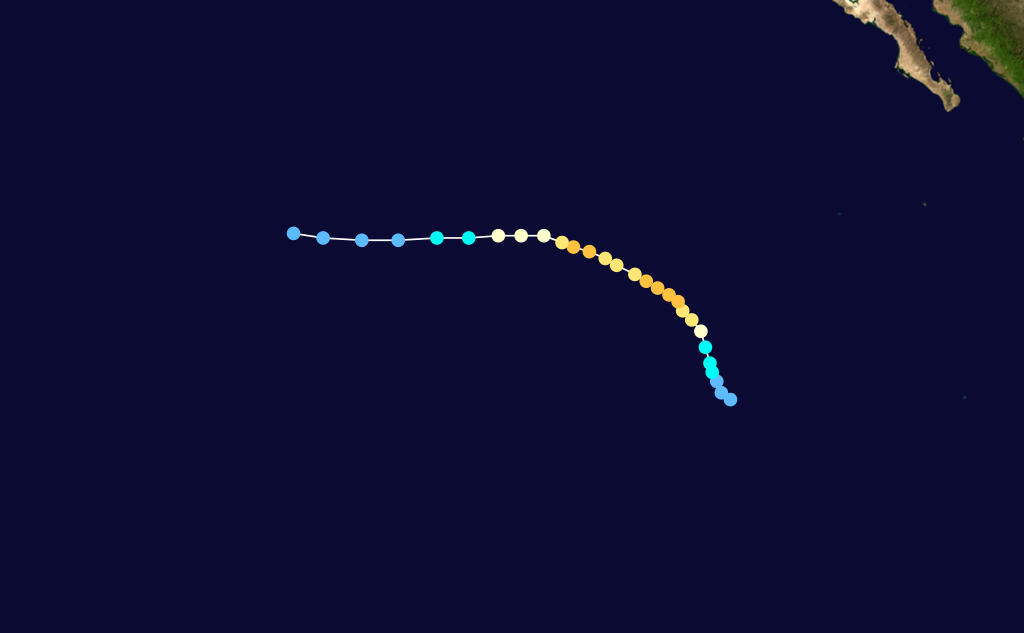
- Duration: September 20 – September 26
- Peak intensity: 115 mph (185 km/h) (1-min);

Otis originated from the a tropical disturbance embedded in the monsoon trough. It moved over the warm waters south of the Mexican Riviera from September 17 to September 19. At 0000 UTC September 20, the disturbance was upgraded into Tropical Depression Nineteen-E while moving to the northwest. It strengthened into a tropical storm later that day while located 950 mi (1,530 km) southwest of La Paz. Eighteen hours later on September 21, Otis intensified into a hurricane. It also began to turn back to the west and began to undergo a period of rapid deepening. On September 22, Otis reached its peak windspeed of 115 mph (185 km/h). It would oscillate irregularly between that strength and Category 2 intensity until September 24. That day, it began accelerating to the west as it lost strength due to increased wind shear and decreasing ocean temperature. Otis fell to tropical storm strength on September 25 and a depression on September 26, and dissipated shortly after that.

=== Hurricane Peke ===
- Category 2 hurricane (SSHWS)
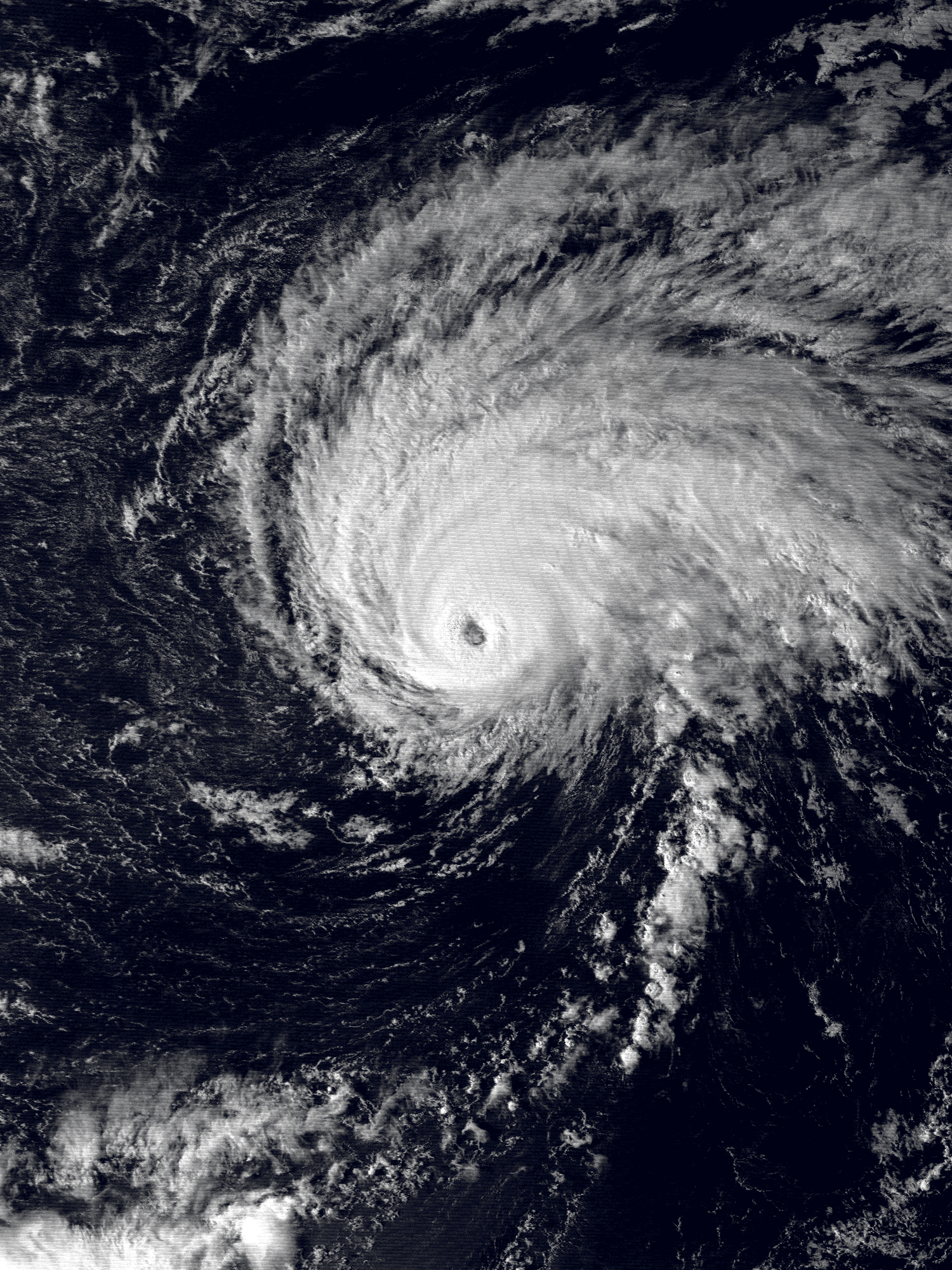
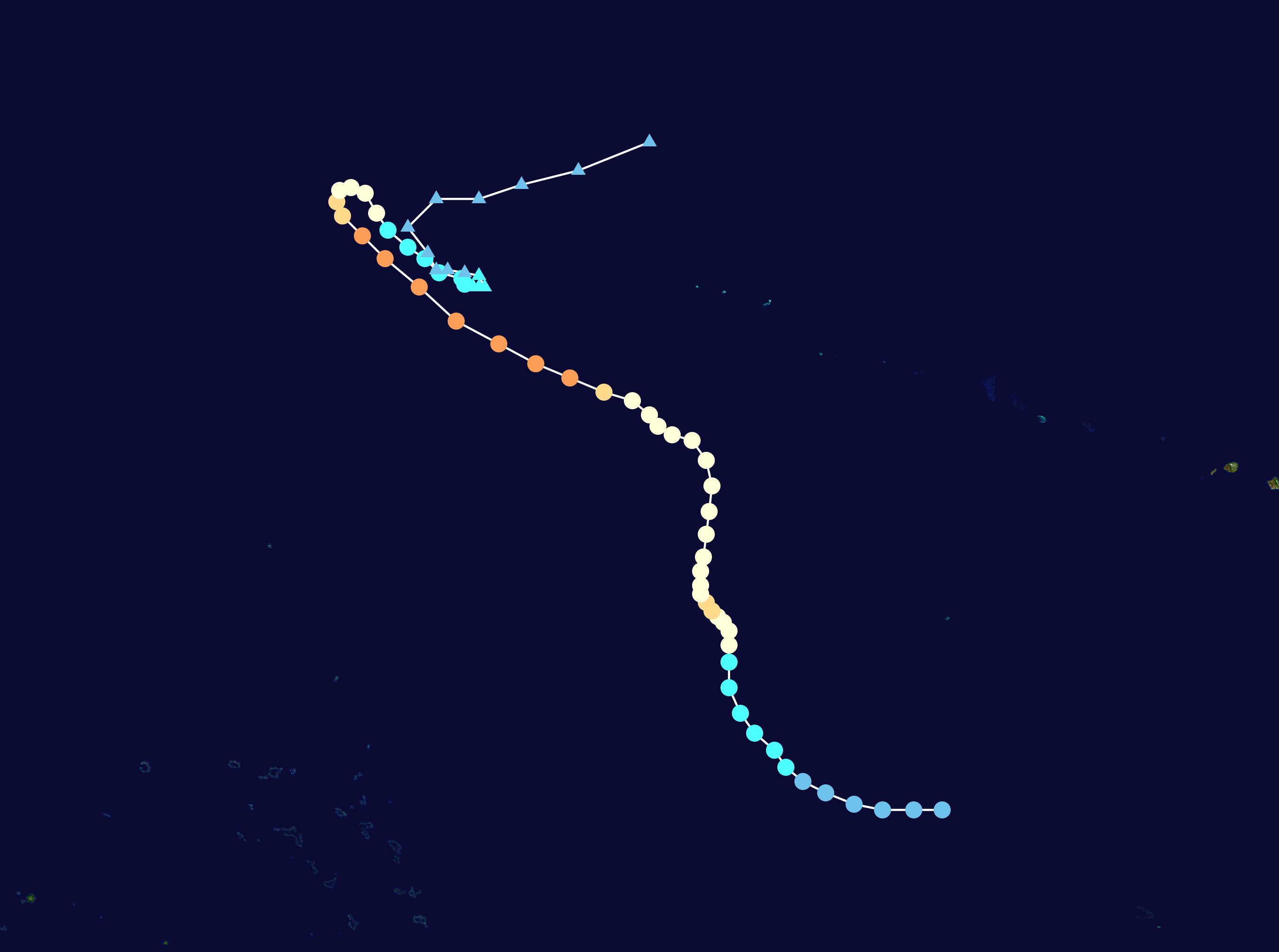
- Duration: September 21 – September 27 (exited basin)
- Peak intensity: 100 mph (155 km/h) (1-min);

An area of disturbed weather southwest of Hawaii gathered enough convection and a closed circulation to become Tropical Depression Two-C on September 21. It immediately strengthened into a storm and was named Peke. Peke continued to strengthen as it tracked north just east of the International Date Line. Peke intensified into a hurricane on September 23 and reached Category 2 intensity the next day. Peke continued heading north and shortly after weakening into a Category 1 hurricane, it turned to the northwest and crossed the dateline. It re-intensified, and peaked as a 115 mph (185 km/h) typhoon on September 23. It accelerated to the northwest and began to take in drier air, which caused weakening. On October 2, Peke re-curved to the southeast. The last advisory on this tropical cyclone was issued on October 3 as it dissipated. Peke's remnants continued drifting erratically for over three days, first heading east, then northwest, and then southeast, at which time they were finally unidentifiable.

Hurricane/Typhoon Peke caused no damages or deaths. However, was also the first tropical cyclone of hurricane strength to cross the dateline since Hurricane Sarah (1967) to cross the dateline at that strength. In addition, Peke was the third tropical cyclone in three years to exist on both sides of the dateline, after 1985's Typhoon Skip and 1986's Typhoon Georgette.

=== Tropical Storm Pilar ===
- Tropical storm (SSHWS)
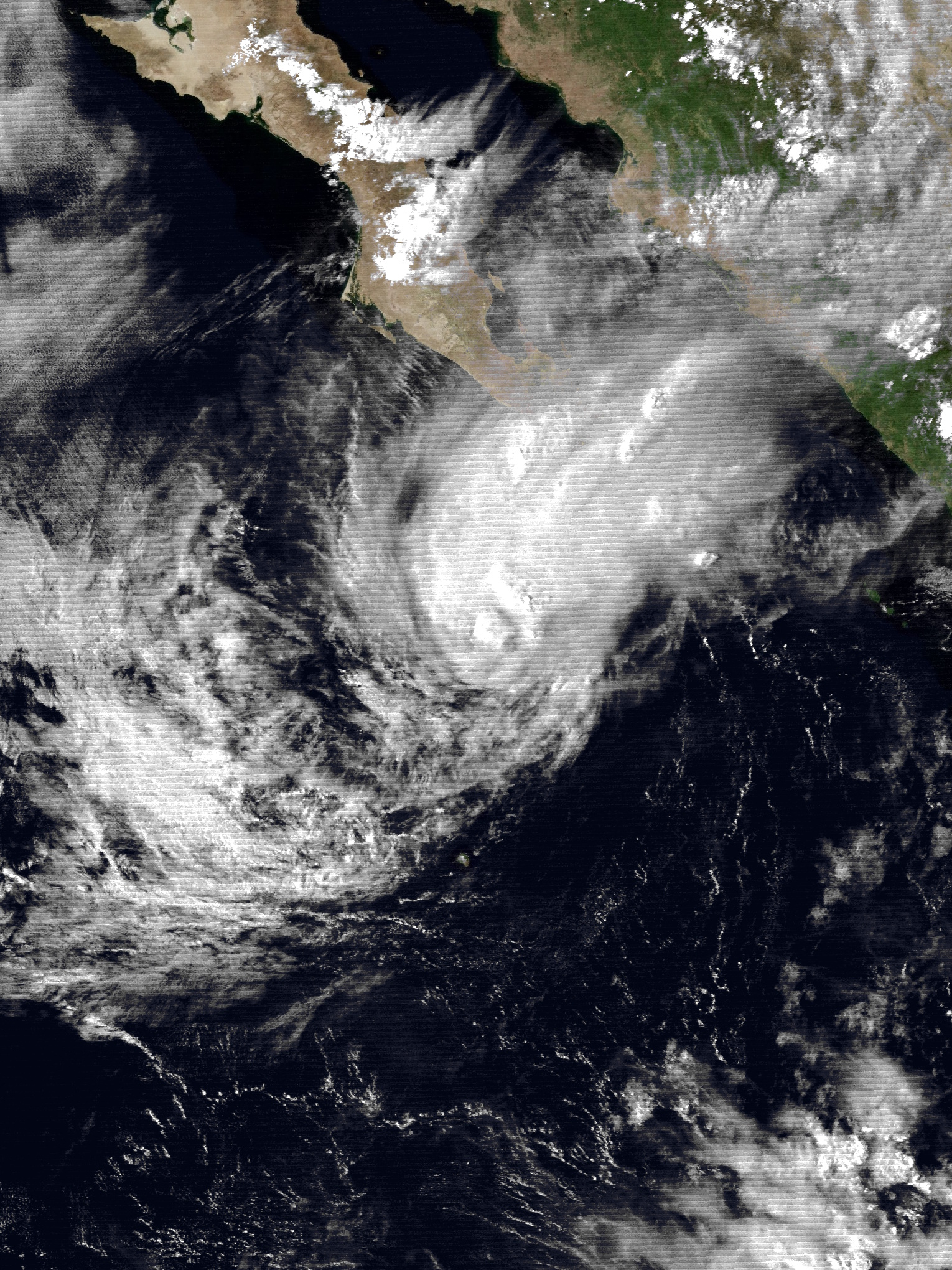
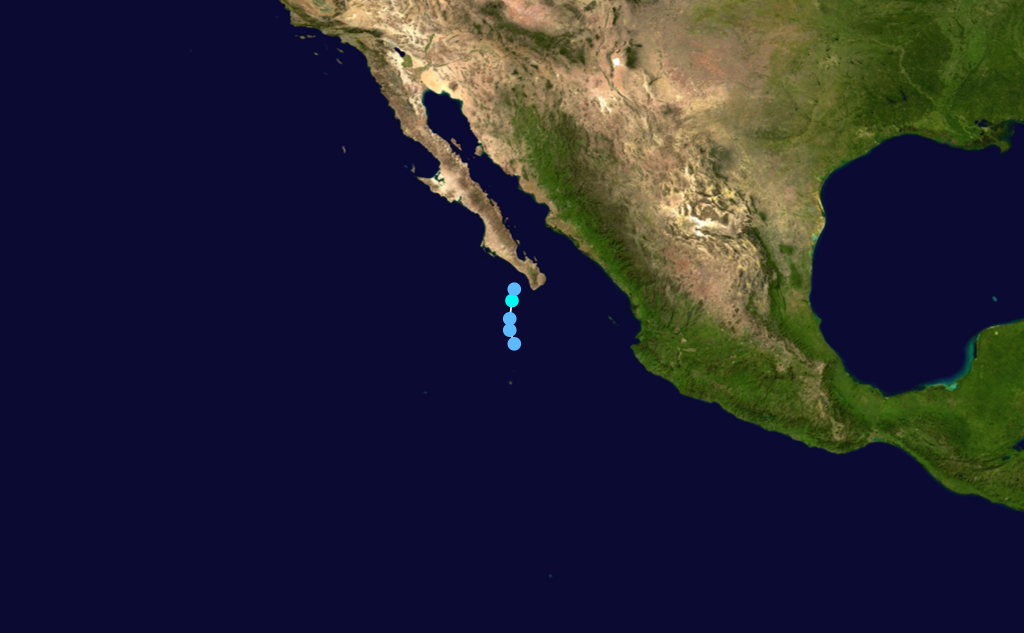
- Duration: September 30 – October 1
- Peak intensity: 40 mph (65 km/h) (1-min);

A tropical depression formed on September 30 while located 330 mi (530 km) south of the Baja California Peninsula. It headed north and peaked as a minimal tropical storm on October 1. After being a tropical storm for a mere six hours, Pilar weakened to a depression and dissipated that same day. It never made landfall, dissipating just south of the southern tip of the Baja California Peninsula. It was a tropical cyclone for a total of 24 hours. The system caused no known damage on land, but Pilar dropped heavy precipitation on Baja California Sur from 1200 UTC on September 30 until 0000 UTC October 2. An observer station reported 7.15 in (182 mm) of rainfall. This was the most rainfall the weather station had ever recorded since its founding in 1969.

=== Hurricane Ramon ===
- Category 4 hurricane (SSHWS)
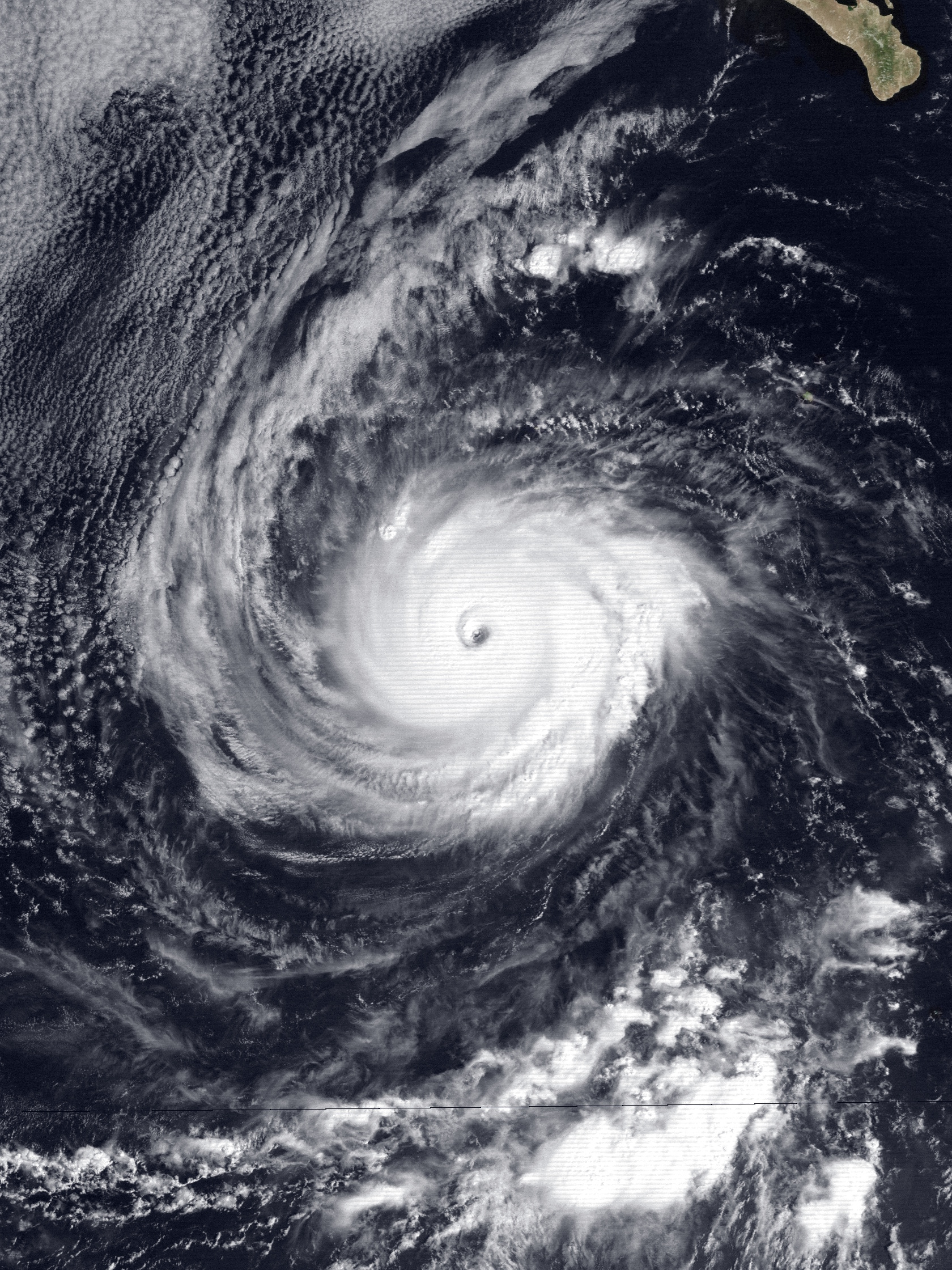
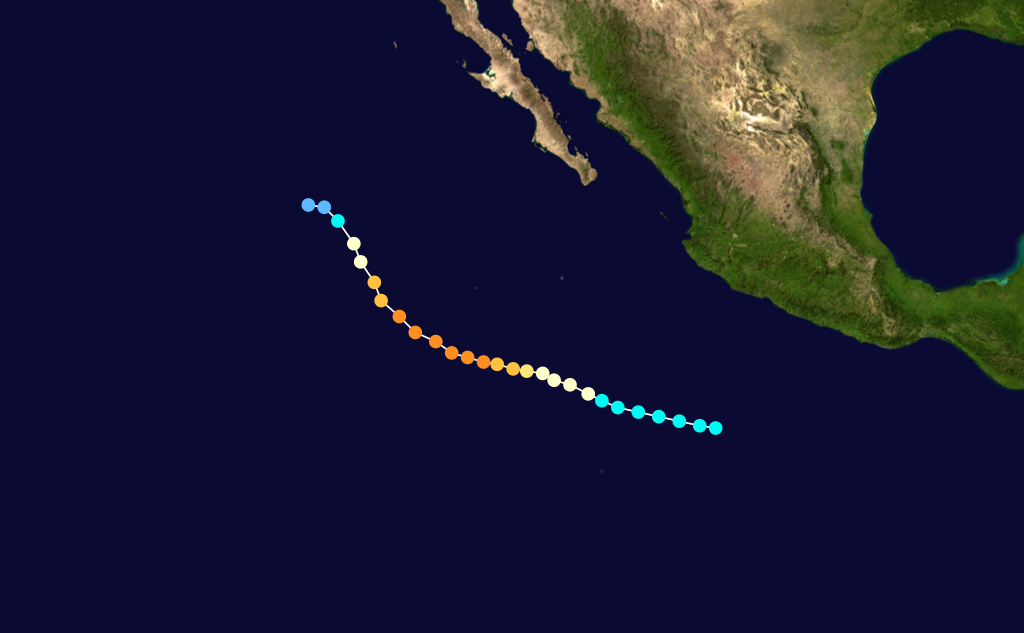
- Duration: October 5 – October 12
- Peak intensity: 140 mph (220 km/h) (1-min);

On October 3–4 an area of disturbed weather moved into the Pacific Ocean south of a high-pressure area over Central Mexico. The storm became better organized over 84 °F (29 °C) waters. By October 5, a tropical storm had developed 490 mi (790 km) southwest of Manzanillo, bypassing the tropical depression stage. It moved generally to the west-northwest. Ramon intensified into a hurricane on October 7 and reached major hurricane status on October 8. At its most intense on October 9 and October 10, Hurricane Ramon had winds of 140 mph (225 km/h). After peaking, Ramon turned to the northwest due to interaction with subtropical jetstream winds and rapidly weakened over cooler sea surface temperatures. It became a tropical storm on October 11 and a depression on October 12. It dissipated shortly thereafter.

Torrential rains deluged Southern California, resulting in street flooding. Two people perished in separate traffic accidents. In Los Angeles, three more people perished in separate traffic incidents. Heavy rains extended west and was also reported in Hemet in Riverside County, where three people were also injured during a car accident. The rains helped dissolve a week-long forest fire 16,000 acre (65,000,000 m^{2}) on Mt. Palomar. The Spring Creek River overflowed its banks. The tropical moisture also helped end a 37-day dry spell at Salt Lake City, marking the longest time the city went without rain since 1964. Nationwide, Ramon killed five people, all due to road-related incidents.

=== Tropical Storm Selma ===
- Tropical storm (SSHWS)
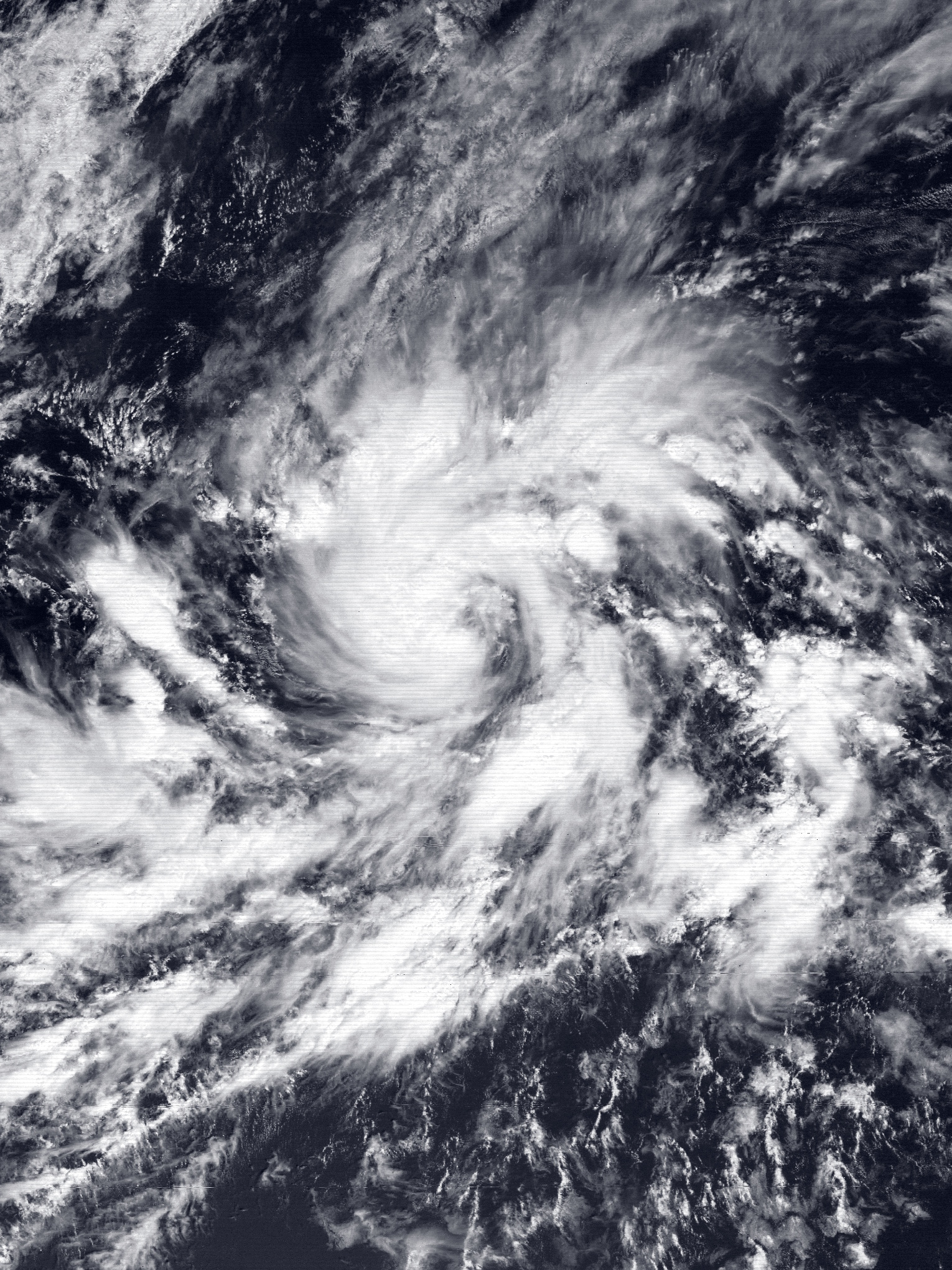
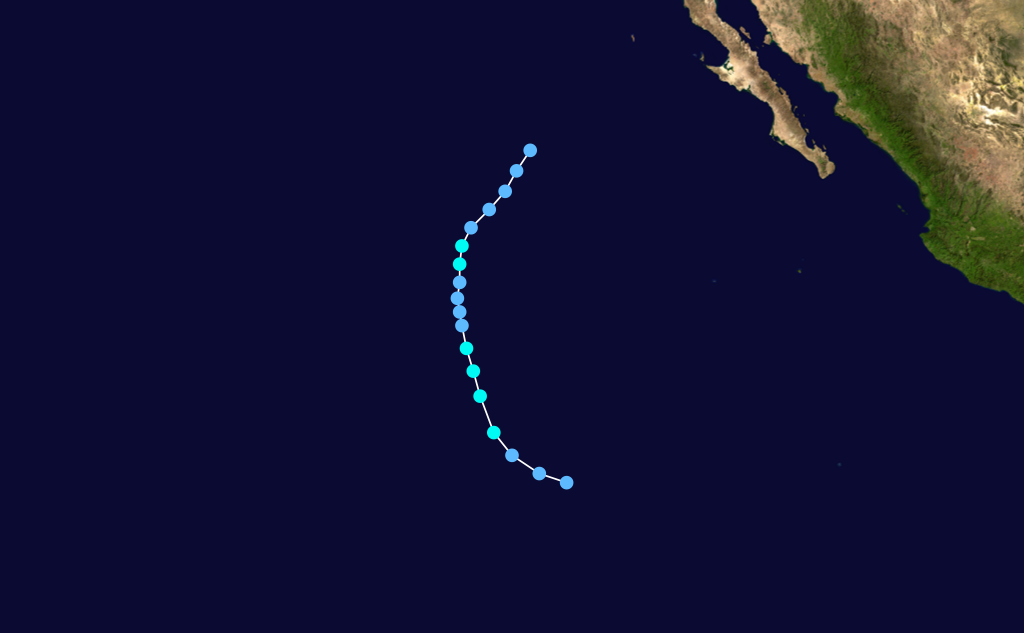
- Duration: October 27 – October 31
- Peak intensity: 40 mph (65 km/h) (1-min);

On October 27, a tropical depression formed and headed northwest, gradually re-curving north. It intensified into a 40 mph (65 km/h) tropical storm on October 28. Selma maintained that strength until the next day, when it weakened to a depression. Selma's re-curving continued, and on October 29, it again intensified into a 40 mph (65 km/h) tropical storm. Without further strengthening, it weakened into a tropical depression, headed north northeast, and dissipated on October 31 about 880 mi (1,415 km) east of the southern tip of Baja California.

=== Tropical depressions ===
On June 10, a weak tropical depression, the second of the season, developed. It moved very little and did not affect land. It dissipated on 1200 UTC June 12. The season's next tropical cyclone, Tropical Depression Three formed six days after the previous one dissipated. Moving west-northwest, it peaked at 35 mph (55 km/h). On June 20, it dissipated.

Tropical Depression Six developed on July 13 about 900 mi (1,400 km) southwest of Cabo San Lucas. The depression had same peak intensity as Three and had dissipated on July 17. According to the Joint Typhoon Warning Center, on July 18 a tropical depression formed east of the International Date Line, and two days later it exited CPHC's area of responsibility; however, this storm was not included into CPHC database. As it entered into western Pacific, it strengthened as a tropical storm and received the name Wynne. The final tropical cyclone developed at 1800 UTC November 24 around 1,000 mi (1,600 km) southwest of Baja California Sur. A very weak cyclone, the depression dissipated on November 25, ending the above-average season.

== Storm names ==
The following list of names was used for named storms that formed in the North Pacific Ocean east of 140°W in 1987. This is essentially the same list used for the 1981 season, though the rotating lists went only to the "W" name at the time. Storms were named Pilar and Ramon for the first time in 1987; the name Selma had been used previously used in the old four-year lists.

- Adrian
- Beatriz
- Calvin
- Dora
- Eugene
- Fernanda *
- Greg
- Hilary
- Irwin
- Jova *
- Knut
- Lidia
- Max
- Norma
- Otis
- Pilar
- Ramon
- Selma
- Todd (unused)
- Veronica (unused)
- Wiley (unused)
- Xina (unused)
- York (unused)
- Zelda (unused)

For storms that form in the North Pacific from 140°W to the International Date Line, the names come from a series of four rotating lists. Names are used one after the other without regard to year, and when the bottom of one list is reached, the next named storm receives the name at the top of the next list. Two named storms, listed below, formed in the central North Pacific in 1987. Named storms in the table above that crossed (or their remnants) into the area during the year are noted (*).

- Oka
- Peke

=== Retirement ===
In 1992, the World Meteorological Organization retired the name Knut from further use in the Eastern Pacific for unknown reasons. It was replaced with Kenneth for the 1993 season.

== Season effects ==
1987 Pacific hurricane season statistics
Storm name	Dates active	Storm category at peak intensity	Max 1-min wind mph (km/h)	Min. press. (mbar)	Areas affected	Damage (US$)	Deaths	Ref(s).
Adrian	June 7-9	Tropical storm	45 (75)	Unknown	None	None	None	
Beatriz	July 3-7	Category 1 hurricane	50 (85)	Unknown	None	None	None	
Calvin	July 5-10	Tropical storm	65 (100)	Unknown	None	None	None	
Dora	July 15-20	Tropical storm	60 (95)	Unknown	Socorro Island	None	None	
Eugene	July 22-26	Category 2 hurricane	100 (155)	Unknown	Western Mexico	$142 million	3	
Fernanda	July 24-31	Tropical storm	65 (100)	Unknown	None	None	None	
Greg	July 28-August 3	Category 1 hurricane	80 (130)	Unknown	Western Mexico	None	None	
Hilary	July 31-August 9	Category 3 hurricane	120 (195)	Unknown	Southern California	None	None	
Irwin	August 3-9	Tropical storm	65 (100)	Unknown	Western Mexico	$2.1 million	None	
Jova	August 13-22	Category 2 hurricane	105 (165)	Unknown	Johnston Atoll	None	None	
Oka	August 26-29	Tropical storm	60 (95)	Unknown	None	None	None	
Knut	August 28-30	Tropical storm	40 (65)	Unknown	None	None	None	
Lidia	August 29-September 3	Category 1 hurricane	85 (140)	Unknown	California	None	None	
Max	September 9-16	Category 4 hurricane	155 (250)	Unknown	None	None	None	
Norma	September 14-20	Category 1 hurricane	75 (120)	Unknown	Socorro Island, Baja California peninsula, Southwestern United States	Minimal	None	
Otis	September 20-25	Category 3 hurricane	115 (185)	Unknown	None	None	None	
Peke	September 21-27	Category 2 hurricane	105 (165)	Unknown	None	None	None	
Pilar	September 30-October 1	Tropical storm	40 (65)	Unknown	Baja California Sur	None	None	
Ramon	October 5-12	Category 4 hurricane	140 (220)	Unknown	Mexico (Baja California), Southwestern United States (California, Nevada, Arizona, Utah, Colorado)	Minimal	5	
Selma	October 27-31	Tropical storm	40 (65)	Unknown	None	None	None	
Season aggregates
20 systems	June 7-November 25		155 (250)	Unknown		$144.1 million	8	

== See also ==
- List of Pacific hurricanes
- Pacific hurricane season
- 1987 Atlantic hurricane season
- 1987 Pacific typhoon season
- 1987 North Indian Ocean cyclone season
- Southern Hemisphere tropical cyclone seasons: 1986–87, 1987–88
