= List of storms named Ramon =

The name Ramon has been used for five tropical cyclones worldwide: three in the East Pacific Ocean and two in the Philippine Area of Responsibility in the West Pacific Ocean.

In the East Pacific:

- Hurricane Ramon (1987) – strong Category 4 hurricane whose remnants produced heavy rainfall in Southern California
- Tropical Storm Ramon (2017) – weak and short-lived tropical storm near the coast of Southern Mexico
- Tropical Storm Ramon (2023) – late-season tropical storm that did not threaten any land areas

In the West Pacific:

- Tropical Storm Banyan (2011) (T1120, 23W, Ramon) – struck the Philippines
- Typhoon Kalmaegi (2019) (T1926, 27W, Ramon) – Category 2 typhoon that also struck the Philippines

== See also ==
- Storm Roman (2025) – a European windstorm with a similar name

Preceded by Quiel	Pacific typhoon season names Ramon	Succeeded by Sarah
