= Hurricane Ramon =

Category 4 1987 Pacific hurricane

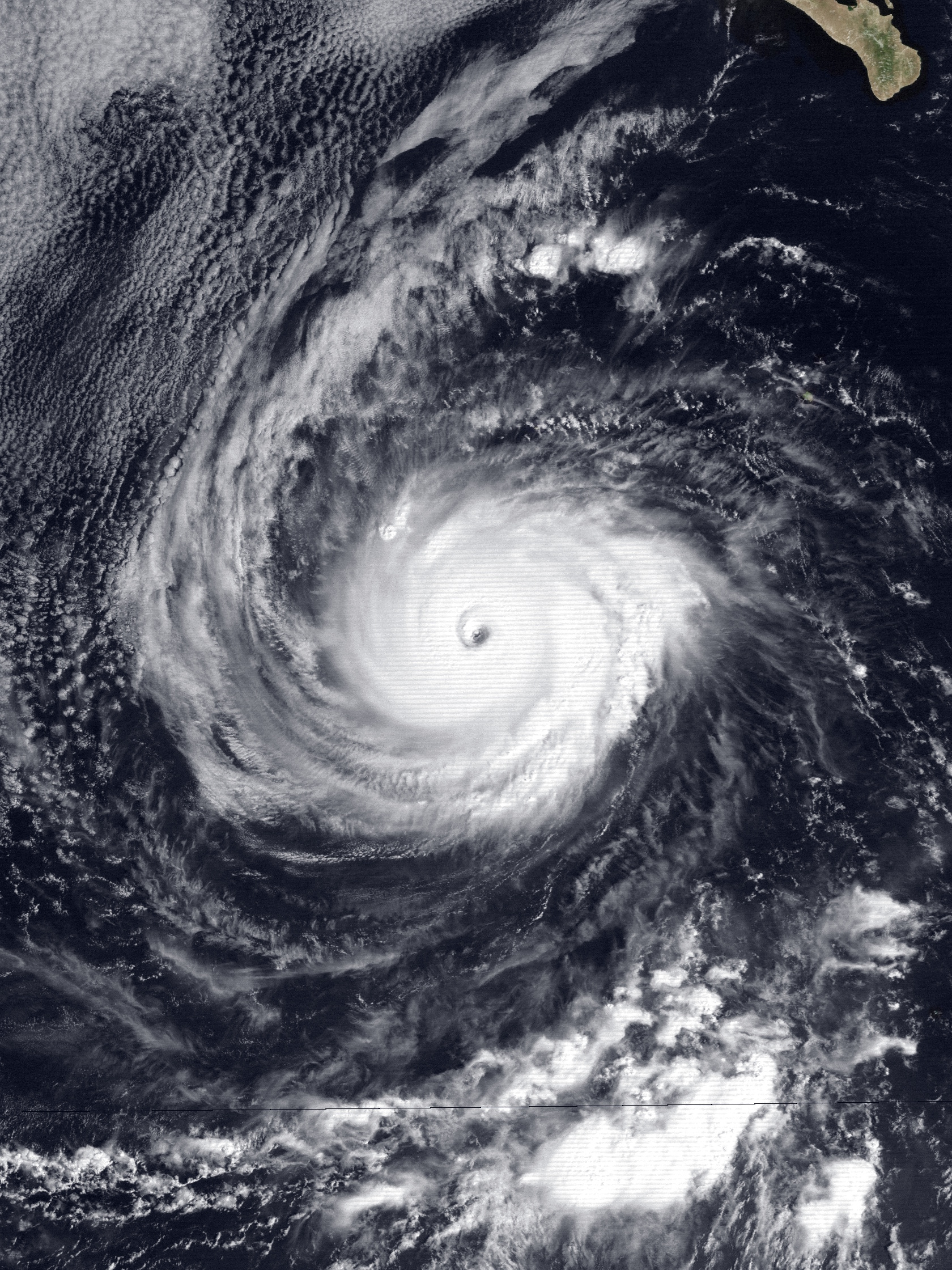
- Hurricane Ramon at peak intensity over the eastern Pacific Ocean on October 9

Meteorological history
- Formed: October 5, 1987
- Dissipated: October 12, 1987

Category 4 major hurricane
- 1-minute sustained (SSHWS/NWS)
- Highest winds: 140 mph (220 km/h)

Overall effects
- Fatalities: 5 indirect
- Damage: Minimal
- Areas affected: Mexico (Baja California), Southwestern United States (California, Nevada, Arizona, Utah, Colorado)
- IBTrACS
- Part of the 1987 Pacific hurricane season

Hurricane Ramon was a very intense Pacific hurricane whose remnants generated heavy rains in Southern California. The 19th named storm and final hurricane of the above-average 1987 Pacific hurricane season, Ramon originated from a tropical disturbance that formed in early October. On October 5, a tropical storm had developed several hundred miles southwest of Manzanillo, bypassing the tropical depression stage. Tropical Storm Ramon turned to the west-northwest after initially moving west. It intensified into a hurricane on October 7. Two days later, Hurricane Ramon peaked in intensity with winds of 140 mph (220 km/h). After peaking, Ramon turned to the northwest and rapidly weakened over cooler waters. It weakened into a tropical storm on October 11 and a depression on October 12. Ramon dissipated shortly thereafter. While at sea, Ramon brought light rainfall to the Baja California Peninsula. The remnants of Hurricane Ramon produced heavy rainfall that caused flooding in California, indirectly contributing to five traffic-related fatalities. Rainfall was reported as far inland as Utah.

== Meteorological history ==
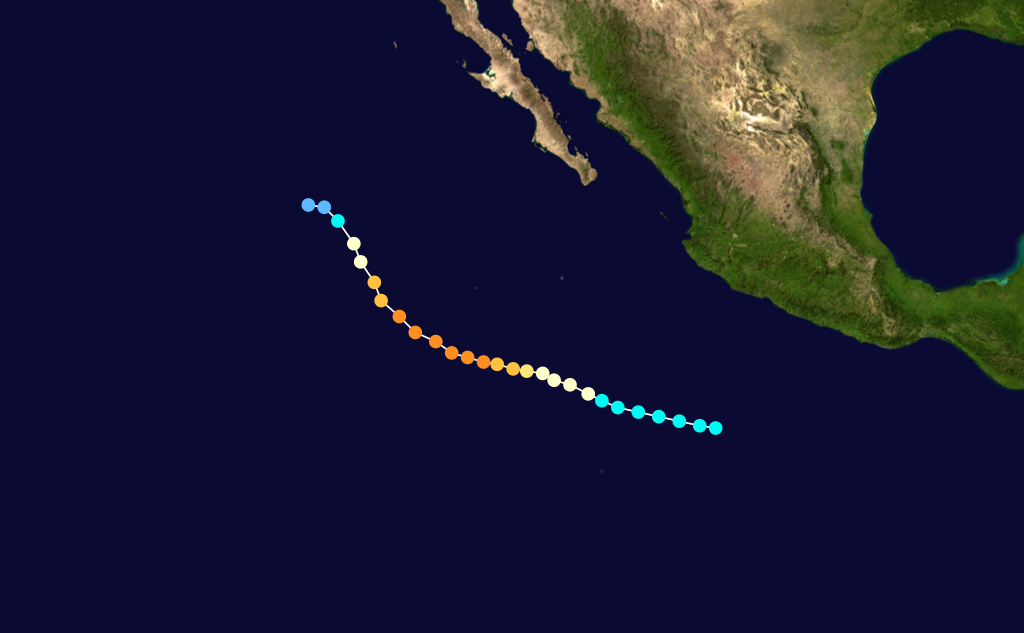
Map plotting the storm's track and intensity, according to the Saffir–Simpson scale Map key Saffir–Simpson scale Tropical depression (≤38 mph, ≤62 km/h) Tropical storm (39–73 mph, 63–118 km/h) Category 1 (74–95 mph, 119–153 km/h) Category 2 (96–110 mph, 154–177 km/h) Category 3 (111–129 mph, 178–208 km/h) Category 4 (130–156 mph, 209–251 km/h) Category 5 (≥157 mph, ≥252 km/h) Unknown Storm type Tropical cyclone Subtropical cyclone Extratropical cyclone, remnant low, tropical disturbance, or monsoon depression

Hurricane Ramon originated from a tropical disturbance that was situated south of a large ridge over Central Mexico. The disturbance became better organized while traversing 84 °F (29 °C) waters and at 1800 UTC on October 5, the Eastern Pacific Hurricane Center (EPHC) upgraded the disturbance into a tropical storm while centered about 575 mi (925 km) southwest of Acapulco. Initially, the storm was expected to move west and not affect land; however, this did not occur. After being named, Tropical Storm Ramon held onto marginal tropical storm intensity for 24 hours. Thereafter, Tropical Storm Ramon turned west-northwestward and began to intensity. At 1200 UTC on October 7, the EPHC reported that Ramon had intensified into a hurricane. About 24 hours later, the system was upgraded into a Category 2 hurricane on the Saffir-Simpson Hurricane Wind Scale (SSHWS). Rapidly intensifying, Ramon reached major hurricane status on October 8 (Category 3 or higher on the SSHWS). At 0600 UTC on October 9, Ramon was upgraded into a Category 4 hurricane while reaching its peak intensity of 140 mph (220 km/h), which it maintained for 24 hours.

After attaining peak intensity, Hurricane Ramon began to weaken. Late on October 10, Ramon weakened slightly while turning northwest. The following morning, the storm reportedly weakened into a Category 2. Hurricane Ramon began to rapidly deteriorate due to a combination of jetstream interactions and increasingly cold sea-surface temperatures. At 0600 UTC on October 11, the storm was downgraded into a Category 1 on the SSHWS after bypassing the Category 2 stage. It weakened into a tropical storm later that day and was further downgraded to a tropical depression on October 12. Tropical Depression Ramon dissipated on 0600 UTC that day. The remnant moisture of this hurricane later moved into Southern California, resulting in record rains.

== Preparations and impact ==
Although Hurricane Ramon was far from the state of California at that time, a flash flood watch was issued for southern Orange, San Diego, western San Bernardino and Riverside counties, citing uncertainty in the storm's path. Additionally, "alerts" were also posted over a wide area that included the Santa Ana Mountains, the Laguna Mountains, Lake Arrowhead, and Joshua Tree National Monument. While still at sea, the storm produced high waves along the Pacific coast in the Baja California Peninsula; Cabo San Lucas reported waves 3 ft (0.91 m) high. The outer rainband's of Hurricane Ramon brought scattered showers to the region.

The remnants of this storm caused extremely heavy rains across Southern California, peaking at 2.14 in (54 mm) in Camp Pendelton. A total of 0.5 in (13 mm) of rain was reported in San Diego, resulting in street flooding. Torrential rainfall was recorded in San Diego County, where two people died in separate traffic accidents. Further north, in the city of Los Angeles, three more people perished in separate traffic incidents. Heavy rains extended west and was also reported in Hemet in Riverside County, where three people were also injured during a car accident. The rains caused a week-long forest fire 16,000 acre (65,000,000 m^{2}) on Mt. Palomar to dissolve. Several streets were closed in Orange County and San Diego County. One library's roof leaked, as such, books had to be covered for protection. Furthermore, the Spring Creek River overflowed its banks. Elsewhere, the moisture spread rains to Nevada, Arizona, Utah, and southwestern Colorado. The tropical moisture also helped end a 37-day dry spell in Salt Lake City, marking the longest time the city went without rain since 1964.

== See also ==
- Other storms named Ramon
- List of California hurricanes
- Hurricane Ismael (1983)
- List of Category 4 Pacific hurricanes
