= List of storms named Quiel =

The name Quiel has been used for three tropical cyclones in the Philippine Area of Responsibility by PAGASA in the Western Pacific Ocean.

- Tropical Depression Quiel (2003) – a short-lived system that was only recognized by PAGASA.
- Typhoon Nalgae (2011) (T1119, 23W, Quiel) – struck the Philippines as a Category 4 super typhoon and later affected Hainan, China as a weak tropical storm.
- Typhoon Nakri (2019) (T1925, 25W, Quiel)- developed west of the main Philippine Islands and made landfall in Southern Vietnam.

Preceded by Perla	Pacific typhoon season names Quiel	Succeeded by Ramon
