= List of Mexico hurricanes =

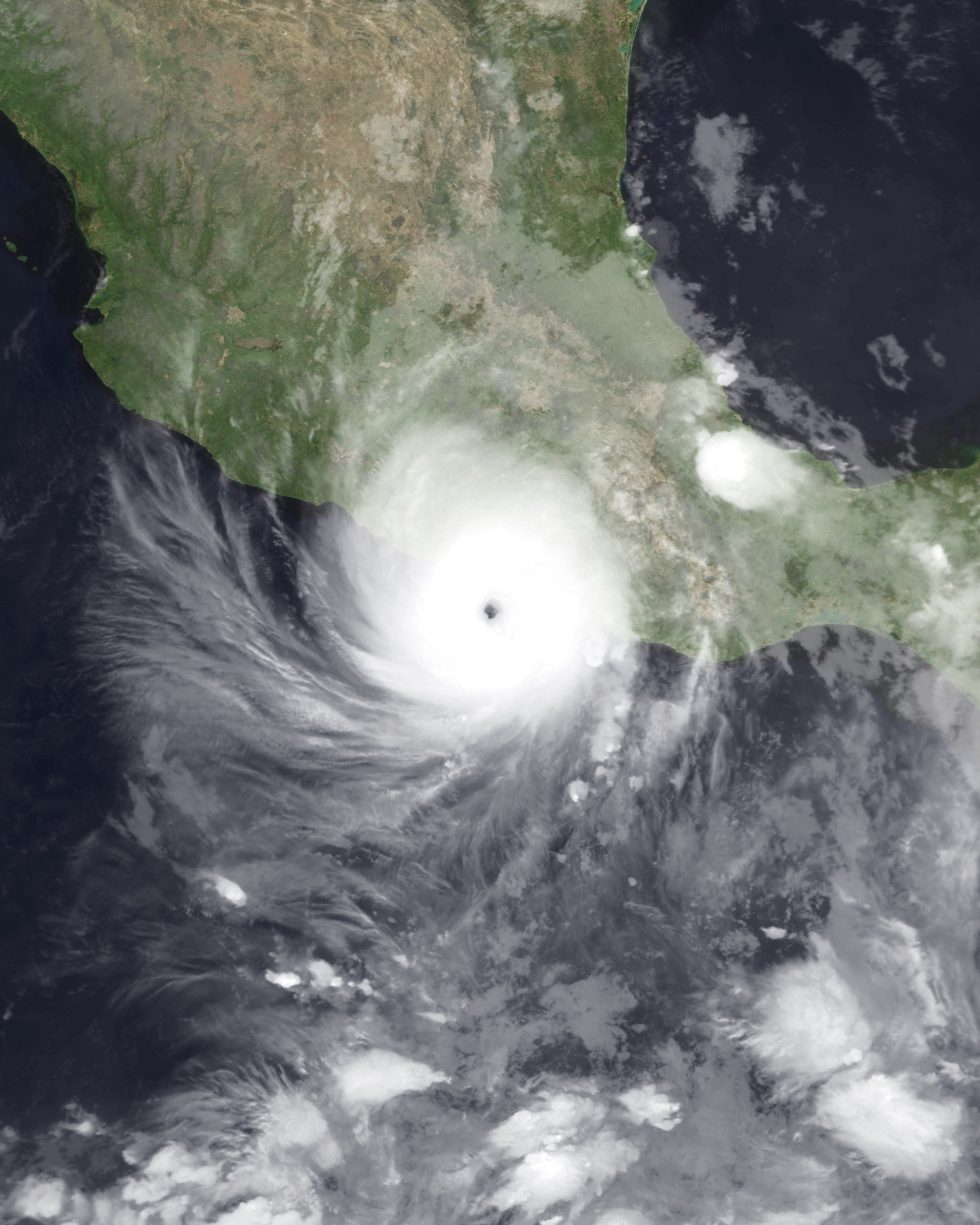
Satellite image of Hurricane Otis, the strongest Pacific hurricane to ever hit Mexico

The North American country of Mexico regularly experiences tropical cyclones from both the Atlantic and the Pacific oceans. Tropical cyclones that produce maximum sustained winds of more than 119 kilometre per hour (74 mph) are designated as hurricanes, which can produce deadly and damaging effects, particularly where they make landfall, or move ashore. Hurricane strength has been ranked using the Saffir-Simpson scale since 1972, from a minimal hurricane as a Category 1 to the most powerful as a Category 5. The most recent Category 5 hurricane to hit Mexico was Hurricane Otis in 2023, which was also the costliest Mexican hurricane.

== Climatology ==
From 1951 to 2000, Pacific hurricanes most frequently struck the northwestern Mexican states Baja California Sur or Sinaloa, as well as Michoacán in southern Mexico. Atlantic hurricanes during the same period were most likely to hit Quintana Roo along the eastern Yucatán peninsula and Veracruz along the Bay of Campeche. Along both coasts, the month with the most landfalls was September, although they can occur as early as May.

== List of states ==
The category listed for each state indicates the maximum category of sustained winds that were recorded or analyzed to have occurred in that state. It is not necessarily the category of the storm at the time of landfall or closest approach (if the strongest winds were occurring elsewhere or only over water at the time).

=== Atlantic states ===
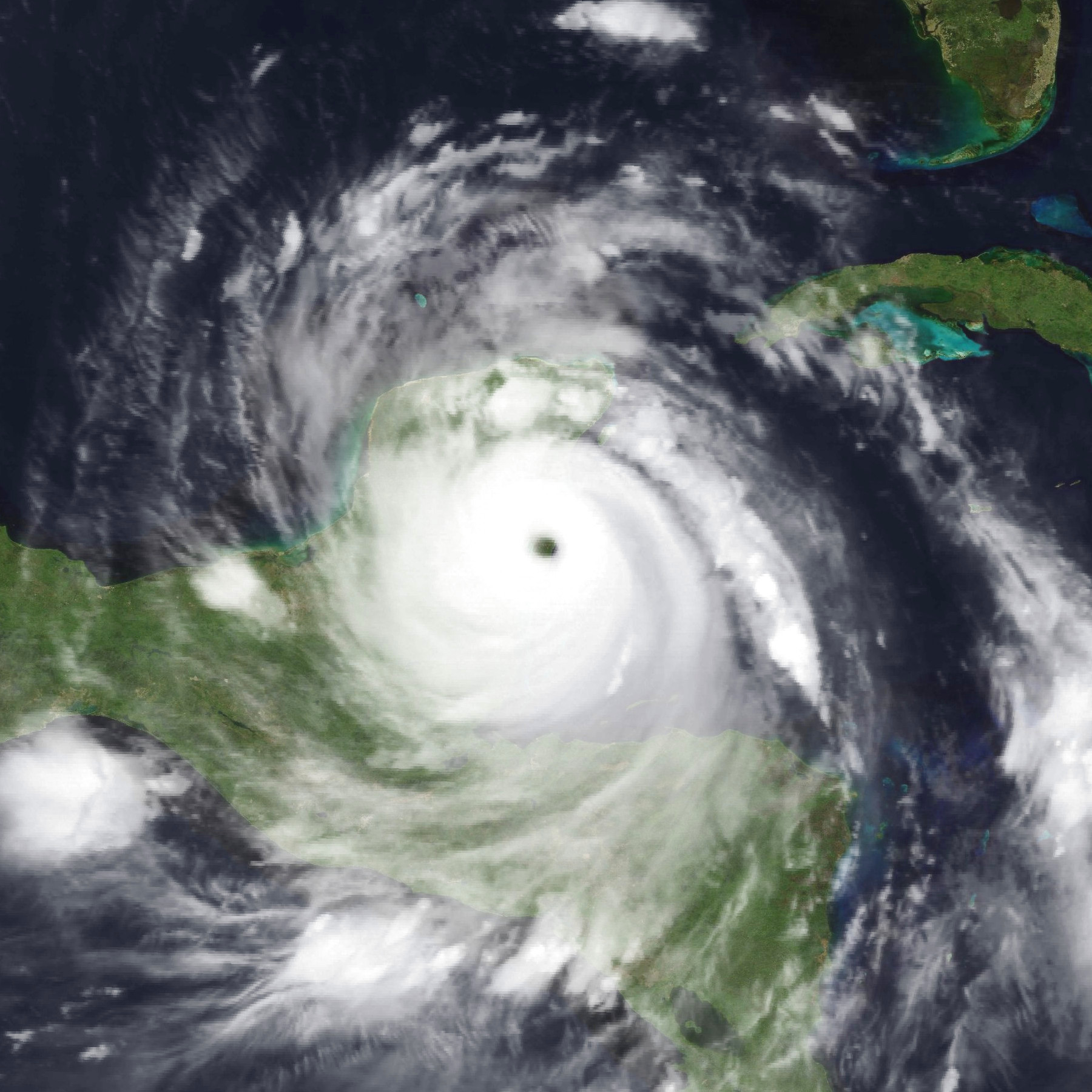
Satellite image of Category 5 Hurricane Dean hitting Quintana Roo in 2007

==== Campeche ====
Name	Saffir–Simpson Category	Date of closest approach	Year
Brenda	Category 1 hurricane	August 21	1973

==== Quintana Roo ====
Name	Saffir–Simpson Category	Date of closest approach	Year
Unnamed	Category 2 hurricane	September 28	1857
Unnamed	Category 1 hurricane	August 16	1866
Unnamed	Category 1 hurricane	November 1	1870
Unnamed	Category 1 hurricane	August 20	1879
Unnamed	Category 2 hurricane	August 9	1880
Unnamed	Category 1 hurricane	July 25	1887
Unnamed	Category 1 hurricane	September 17	1887
Unnamed	Category 1 hurricane	September 6	1888
Unnamed	Category 2 hurricane	September 17	1889
Unnamed	Category 2 hurricane	August 29	1893
Unnamed	Category 2 hurricane	August 27	1895
Unnamed	Category 2 hurricane	August 13	1903
Unnamed	Category 3 hurricane	August 25	1909
Unnamed	Category 2 hurricane	October 15	1916
Unnamed	Category 2 hurricane	October 18	1922
Unnamed	Category 4 hurricane	September 22	1933
Unnamed	Category 2 hurricane	August 27	1942
Unnamed	Category 1 hurricane	September 20	1944
Charlie	Category 4 hurricane	August 20	1951
Hilda	Category 3 hurricane	September 16	1955
Janet	Category 5 hurricane	September 28	1955
Beulah	Category 3 hurricane	September 17	1967
Carmen	Category 4 hurricane	September 2	1974
Gilbert	Category 5 hurricane	September 14	1988
Roxanne	Category 3 hurricane	October 11	1995
Dolly	Category 1 hurricane	August 20	1996
Emily	Category 4 hurricane	July 18	2005
Wilma	Category 4 hurricane	October 21	2005
Dean	Category 5 hurricane	August 21	2007
Ernesto	Category 2 hurricane	August 8	2012
Gamma	Category 1 hurricane	October 3	2020
Delta	Category 2 hurricane	October 7	2020
Zeta	Category 1 hurricane	October 27	2020
Grace	Category 1 hurricane	August 19	2021
Beryl	Category 1 hurricane	July 5	2024

==== Tabasco ====
Name	Saffir–Simpson Category	Date of closest approach	Year
Unnamed	Category 1 hurricane	October 21	1922
Unnamed	Category 1 hurricane	September 21	1944

==== Tamaulipas ====
Hurricane Anita approaching its Tamaulipas landfall in August 1977

Name	Saffir–Simpson Category	Date of closest approach	Year
Unnamed	Category 1 hurricane	July 5	1851
Unnamed	Category 1 hurricane	August 18	1878
Unnamed	Category 4 hurricane	August 13	1880
Unnamed	Category 2 hurricane	August 23	1886
Unnamed	Category 1 hurricane	October 15	1892
Unnamed	Category 2 hurricane	August 30	1895
Unnamed	Category 1 hurricane	August 16	1903
Unnamed	Category 3 hurricane	August 27	1909
Unnamed	Category 1 hurricane	September 7	1921
Unnamed	Category 1 hurricane	July 8	1933
Unnamed	Category 1 hurricane	August 5	1933
Unnamed	Category 1 hurricane	September 15	1933
Unnamed	Category 2 hurricane	September 25	1933
Unnamed	Category 1 hurricane	August 19	1936
Unnamed	Category 1 hurricane	August 28	1938
Charlie	Category 2 hurricane	August 15	1947
Charlie	Category 3 hurricane	August 22	1951
Alice	Category 1 hurricane	June 25	1954
Gladys	Category 1 hurricane	September 5	1955
Hilda	Category 3 hurricane	September 19	1955
Inez	Category 3 hurricane	October 10	1966
Beulah	Category 3 hurricane	September 20	1967
Ella	Category 3 hurricane	September 12	1970
Caroline	Category 3 hurricane	September 1	1975
Anita	Category 5 hurricane	September 2	1977
Barry	Category 1 hurricane	August 21	1983
Gilbert	Category 3 hurricane	September 16	1988
Keith	Category 1 hurricane	October 5	2000
Erika	Category 1 hurricane	August 16	2003
Emily	Category 3 hurricane	July 21	2005
Alex	Category 2 hurricane	July 1	2010
Ingrid	Category 1 hurricane	September 16	2013

==== Veracruz ====
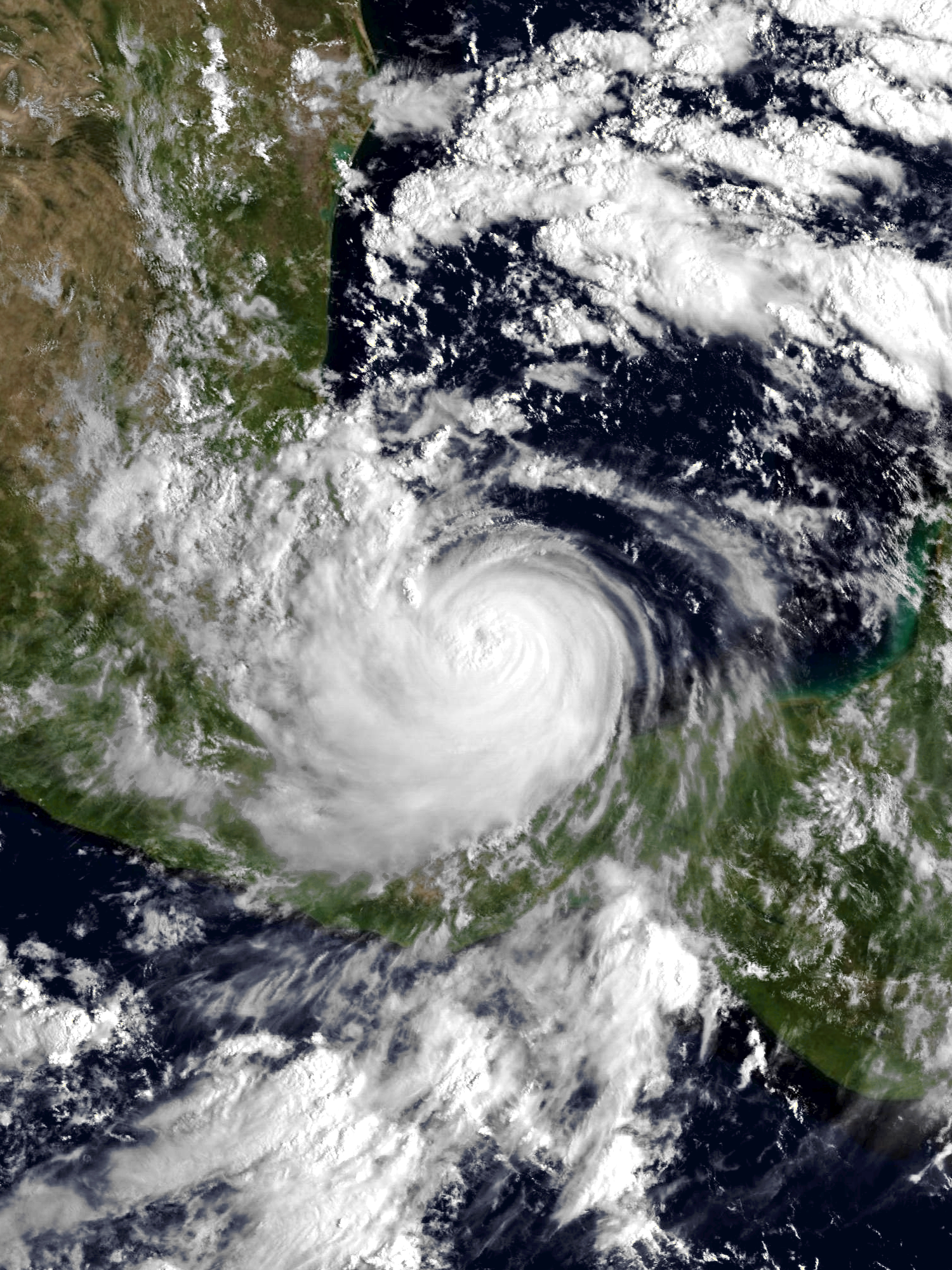
Satellite image of Hurricane Karl in September 2010 nearing Veracruz

Name	Saffir–Simpson Category	Date of closest approach	Year
Unnamed	Category 2 hurricane	July 1	1859
Unnamed	Category 1 hurricane	August 16	1866
Unnamed	Category 1 hurricane	September 8	1888
Unnamed	Category 2 hurricane	September 16	1931
Unnamed	Category 1 hurricane	August 30	1936
Item	Category 2 hurricane	October 11	1950
Janet	Category 2 hurricane	September 29	1955
Anna	Category 1 hurricane	July 26	1956
Debby	Category 1 hurricane	September 3	1988
Diana	Category 2 hurricane	August 7	1990
Gert	Category 2 hurricane	September 20	1993
Dolly	Category 1 hurricane	August 23	1996
Stan	Category 1 hurricane	October 4	2005
Dean	Category 2 hurricane	August 22	2007
Lorenzo	Category 1 hurricane	September 28	2007
Karl	Category 3 hurricane	September 17	2010
Franklin	Category 1 hurricane	August 10	2017
Katia	Category 1 hurricane	September 9	2017
Grace	Category 3 hurricane	August 21	2021

==== Yucatán ====
Name	Saffir–Simpson Category	Date of closest approach	Year
Isidore	Category 3 hurricane	September 22	2002

=== Pacific states ===
==== Baja California ====
Name	Saffir–Simpson Category	Date of closest approach	Year
Nora	Category 1 hurricane	September 25	1997

==== Baja California Sur ====
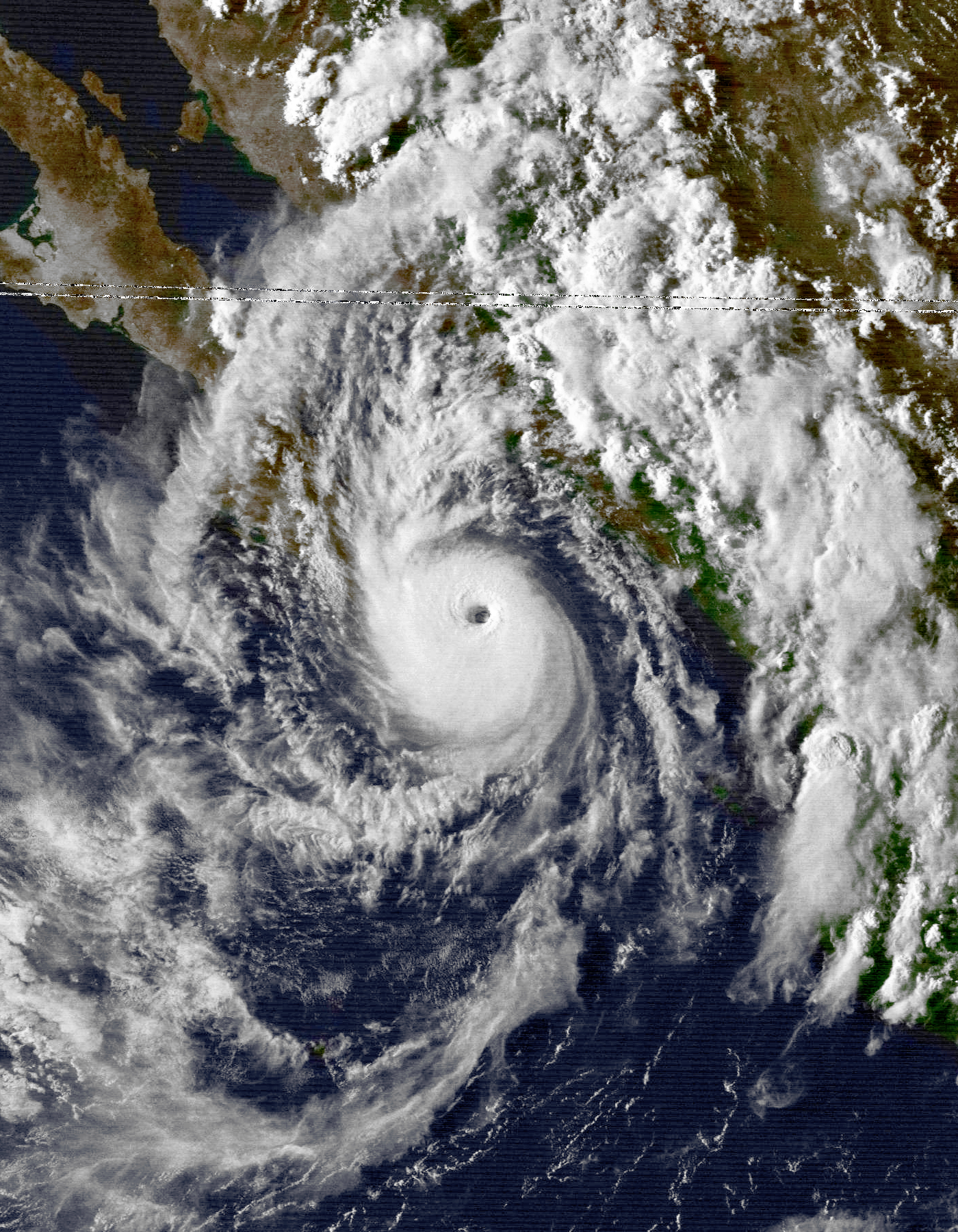
Satellite image of Hurricane Kiko nearing the southern tip of Baja California Sur in August 1989

Name	Saffir–Simpson Category	Date of closest approach	Year
Unnamed	Category 1 hurricane	September 9	1941
Unnamed	Category 1 hurricane	September 11	1949
Unnamed	Category 1 hurricane	July 17	1954
Unnamed	Category 1 hurricane	October 5	1957
Unnamed	Category 1 hurricane	October 4	1958
Unnamed	Category 1 hurricane	September 9	1959
Katrina	Category 1 hurricane	August 31	1967
Pauline	Category 1 hurricane	October 2	1968
Irah	Category 1 hurricane	September 26	1973
Doreen	Category 1 hurricane	August 15	1977
Paul	Category 2 hurricane	September 29	1982
Kiko	Category 3 hurricane	August 27	1989
Lester	Category 1 hurricane	August 23	1992
Henriette	Category 2 hurricane	September 4	1995
Fausto	Category 1 hurricane	September 13	1996
Nora	Category 1 hurricane	September 25	1997
Ignacio	Category 1 hurricane	August 25	2003
Marty	Category 2 hurricane	September 22	2003
John	Category 2 hurricane	September 2	2006
Henriette	Category 1 hurricane	September 4	2007
Norbert	Category 2 hurricane	October 11	2008
Jimena	Category 2 hurricane	September 2	2009
Odile	Category 3 hurricane	September 15	2014
Newton	Category 1 hurricane	September 6	2016
Lorena	Category 1 hurricane	September 21	2019
Olaf	Category 2 hurricane	September 10	2021
Norma	Category 1 hurricane	October 22	2023
Polo	Category 2 hurricane	September 28	2026

==== Chiapas ====
Name	Saffir–Simpson Category	Date of closest approach	Year
Barbara	Category 1 hurricane	May 29	2013

==== Colima ====
Name	Saffir–Simpson Category	Date of closest approach	Year
Unnamed	Category 1 hurricane	October 16	1955
Unnamed	Category 4 hurricane	October 27	1959
Bridget	Category 2 hurricane	June 17	1971
Lily	Category 1 hurricane	August 31	1971
Andres	Category 1 hurricane	June 4	1979
Eugene	Category 1 hurricane	July 25	1987
Winifred	Category 2 hurricane	October 9	1992
Calvin	Category 2 hurricane	July 7	1993

==== Guerrero ====
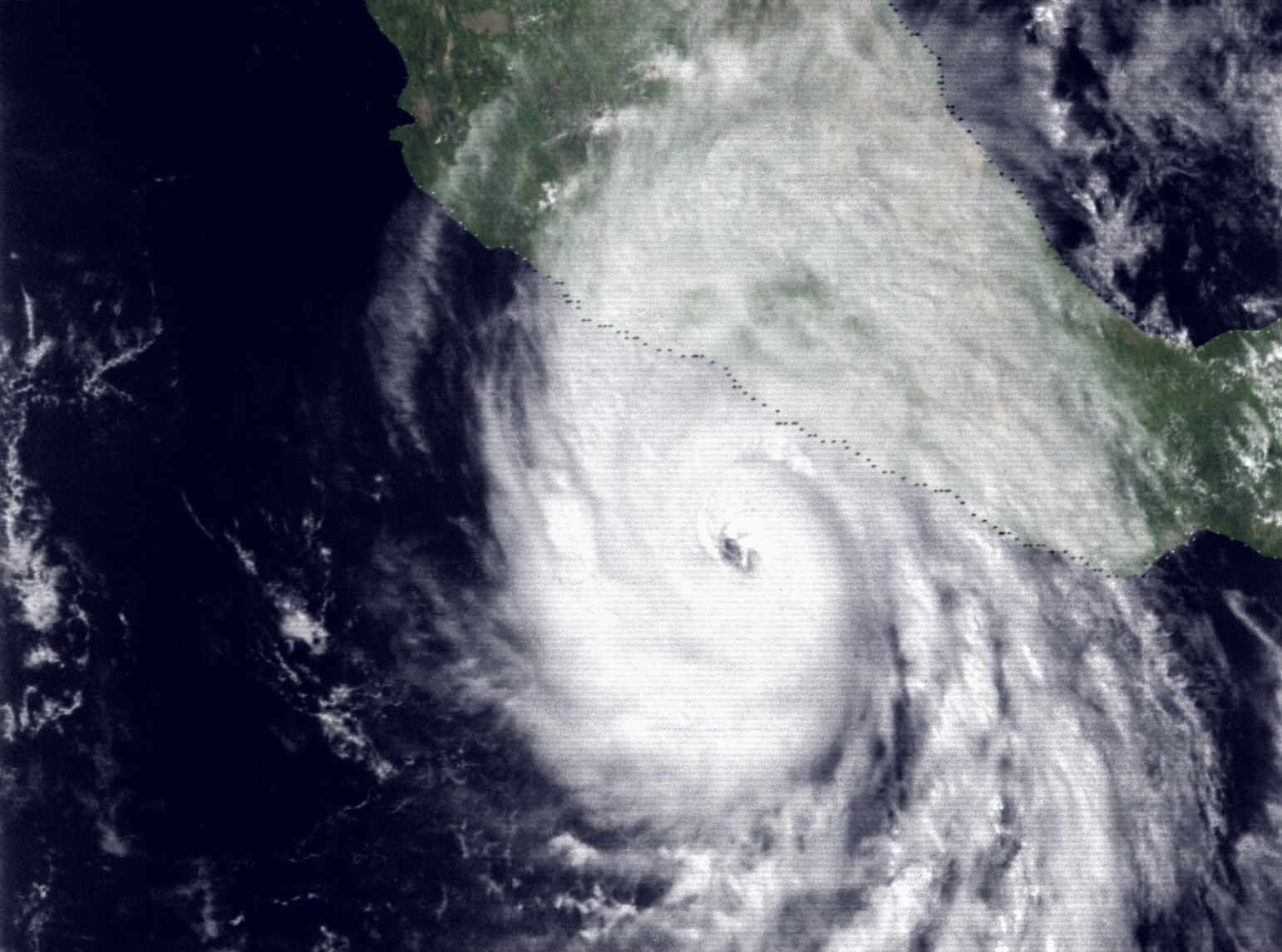
Satellite image of Hurricane Madeline offshore Guerrero in October 1976

Name	Saffir–Simpson Category	Date of closest approach	Year
Unnamed	Category 1 hurricane	June 1	1951
Unnamed	Category 1 hurricane	June 14	1956
Unnamed	Category 1 hurricane	September 18	1957
Tara	Category 1 hurricane	November 12	1961
Agatha	Category 2 hurricane	May 25	1971
Madeline	Category 4 hurricane	October 8	1976
Cosme	Category 1 hurricane	June 21	1989
Boris	Category 1 hurricane	June 29	1996
Hernan	Category 1 hurricane	October 3	1996
Max	Category 1 hurricane	September 14	2017
Rick	Category 2 hurricane	October 25	2021
Otis	Category 5 hurricane	October 25	2023
John	Category 3 hurricane	September 24	2024

==== Jalisco ====
Satellite animation of Hurricane Patricia making landfall in October 2015

Name	Saffir–Simpson Category	Date of closest approach	Year
Jova	Category 2 hurricane	October 12	2011
Patricia	Category 4 hurricane	October 23	2015
Lorena	Category 1 hurricane	September 19	2019
Nora	Category 1 hurricane	August 28	2021
Lidia	Category 4 hurricane	October 11	2023

==== Michoacán ====
Name	Saffir–Simpson Category	Date of closest approach	Year
Emily	Category 1 hurricane	June 30	1963
Virgil	Category 2 hurricane	October 4	1992
Alma	Category 2 hurricane	June 24	1996

==== Nayarit ====
Name	Saffir–Simpson Category	Date of closest approach	Year
Kenna	Category 4 hurricane	October 25	2002
Roslyn	Category 3 hurricane	October 23	2022

==== Oaxaca ====
Name	Saffir–Simpson Category	Date of closest approach	Year
Pauline	Category 2 hurricane	October 9	1997
Rick	Category 1 hurricane	November 10	1997
Carlotta	Category 2 hurricane	June 16	2012
Agatha	Category 2 hurricane	May 30	2022
Erick	Category 3 hurricane	June 19	2025

==== Sinaloa ====
Name	Saffir–Simpson Category	Date of closest approach	Year
Unnamed	Category 4 hurricane	October 9	1943
Unnamed	Category 4 hurricane	October 22	1957
Valerie	Category 1 hurricane	June 25	1962
Doreen	Category 1 hurricane	October 4	1962
Mona	Category 1 hurricane	October 19	1963
Naomi	Category 1 hurricane	September 13	1968
Orlene	Category 1 hurricane	September 24	1974
Olivia	Category 3 hurricane	October 25	1975
Liza	Category 3 hurricane	October 1	1976
Norma	Category 2 hurricane	October 12	1981
Paul	Category 2 hurricane	September 29	1982
Tico	Category 3 hurricane	October 19	1983
Waldo	Category 2 hurricane	October 9	1985
Roslyn	Category 1 hurricane	October 22	1986
Lidia	Category 2 hurricane	September 13	1993
Rosa	Category 2 hurricane	October 14	1994
Ismael	Category 1 hurricane	September 15	1995
Fausto	Category 1 hurricane	September 14	1996
Isis	Category 1 hurricane	September 3	1998
Lane	Category 3 hurricane	September 16	2006
Manuel	Category 1 hurricane	September 19	2013
Willa	Category 3 hurricane	October 22	2018
Pamela	Category 1 hurricane	October 13	2021
Orlene	Category 1 hurricane	October 3	2022

==== Sonora ====
Name	Saffir–Simpson Category	Date of closest approach	Year
Katrina	Category 1 hurricane	September 2	1967
Newton	Category 1 hurricane	September 22	1986
Paine	Category 1 hurricane	October 2	1986
Norbert	Category 1 hurricane	October 12	2008
Polo	Category 1 hurricane	September 29	2026

== Landfall table ==
Name	Year	Category 5	Category 4	Category 3	Category 2	Category 1	Tropical or subtropical storm	Tropical or subtropical depression	Damage (USD)	Deaths	Refs
Unnamed	1851					Tamaulipas					
Unnamed	1857				Quintana Roo						
Unnamed	1859				Veracruz						
Unnamed	1866					Quintana Roo, Veracruz					
Unnamed	1870					Quintana Roo					
Unnamed	1878					Tamaulipas					
Unnamed	1879					Quintana Roo					
Unnamed	1880		Tamaulipas		Quintana Roo					2	
Unnamed	1886				Tamaulipas						
Unnamed	1887				Quintana Roo						
Unnamed	1887				Quintana Roo						
Unnamed	1888					Quintana Roo, Veracruz					
Unnamed	1889				Quintana Roo						
Unnamed	1892					Tamaulipas					
Unnamed	1893				Quintana Roo						
1895	1895				Quintana Roo, Tamaulipas						
1903	1903				Quintana Roo	Tamaulipas					
1909	1909			Quintana Roo, Tamaulipas						3,500	
1916	1916				Quintana Roo						
Unnamed	1921					Tamaulipas					
Unnamed	1922				Quintana Roo	Tabasco					
Unnamed	1931				Veracruz		Quintana Roo				
Unnamed	1933					Tamaulipas				3	
Unnamed	1933					Tamaulipas				7	
Unnamed	1933					Tamaulipas	Quintana Roo			135	
Unnamed	1933		Quintana Roo		Tamaulipas					125	
Unnamed	1936					Tamaulipas					
Unnamed	1936					Veracruz					
Unnamed	1938			Quintana Roo		Tamaulipas				9	
Unnamed	1941					Baja California Sur				15	
Unnamed	1942				Quintana Roo						
Unnamed	1943		Sinaloa						$4.5 million	100	
Unnamed	1944					Quintana Roo, Tabasco				200	
Charlie	1947				Veracruz					48	
Unnamed	1949					Baja California Sur					
Item	1950				Veracruz				$1.5 million		
Unnamed	1951					Guerrero					
Charlie	1951		Quintana Roo	Tamaulipas					$1.16 million	257	
Alice	1954				Tamaulipas					38	
Unnamed	1954					Baja California Sur					
Gladys	1955					Tamaulipas				2	
Hilda	1955			Quintana Roo, Tamaulipas						236	
Janet	1955	Quintana Roo			Veracruz				$4 million	500	
Unnamed	1955					Colima				40	
Unnamed	1956					Guerrero					
Anna	1956					Veracruz					
Unnamed	1957					Guerrero				7	
Unnamed	1957					Baja California Sur	Sonora			2	
Unnamed	1957		Sinaloa						$8 million	8	
Unnamed	1958					Baja California Sur	Sonora			2	
Unnamed	1959					Baja California Sur	Baja California				
Unnamed	1959		Colima						$280 million	1,500	
Tara	1961					Guerrero			$16 million	436	
Valerie	1962					Sinaloa					
Doreen	1962					Sinaloa					
Emily	1963					Michoacán					
Mona	1963					Sinaloa					
Inez	1966			Tamaulipas					$154 million	74	
Katrina	1967					Baja California Sur, Sonora				77	
Beulah	1967			Quintana Roo, Tamaulipas						19	
Olivia	1967			Baja California Sur			Baja California Sur			61	
Naomi	1968					Sinaloa			$1.6 million	4	
Pauline	1968					Baja California Sur	Sonora				
Ella	1970			Tamaulipas						1	
Agatha	1971				Guerrero						
Bridget	1971				Colima				$4 million	17	
Lily	1971					Colima				12	
Brenda	1973					Campeche	Quintana Roo			10	
Irah	1973					Baja California Sur	Sinaloa				
Dolores	1974					Guerrero			$2 million	22	
Carmen	1974		Quintana Roo						$10 million	4	
Orlene	1974					Sinaloa					
Caroline	1975			Tamaulipas							
Olivia	1975			Sinaloa					$20 million	30	
Liza	1976			Sinaloa						1,000	
Madeline	1976		Guerrero							5	
Doreen	1977					Baja California Sur					
Anita	1977	Tamaulipas								10	
Andres	1979					Colima					
Norma	1981				Sinaloa				$24 million	6	
Paul	1982				Baja California Sur, Sinaloa				$70 million	8	
Barry	1983					Tamaulipas					
Tico	1983			Sinaloa					$200 million	135	
Waldo	1985				Sinaloa						
Newton	1986					Sonora					
Paine	1986					Sonora					
Roslyn	1986					Sinaloa					
Eugene	1987					Colima			$142 million	3	
Debby	1988					Veracruz				10	
Gilbert	1988	Quintana Roo		Tamaulipas					$2 billion	202	
Cosme	1989					Guerrero				30	
Kiko	1989			Baja California Sur							
Diana	1990				Veracruz				$90.7 million	139	
Lester	1992					Baja California Sur	Sonora		$3 million	3	
Virgil	1992				Michoacán						
Winifred	1992				Colima				$5 million	3	
Calvin	1993				Colima			Baja California Sur	$32 million	34	
Lidia	1993				Sinaloa					7	
Gert	1993				Veracruz				156 million	45	
Rosa	1994				Sinaloa					4	
Henriette	1995				Baja California Sur						
Ismael	1995					Sinaloa			$26 million	116	
Roxanne	1995			Quintana Roo					1.5 billion	14	
Alma	1996				Michoacán					20	
Boris	1996					Guerrero				5	
Dolly	1996					Quintana Roo, Veracruz				14	
Fausto	1996					Baja California Sur, Sinaloa			$100,000	1	
Hernan	1996					Guerrero				0	
Nora	1997					Baja California Sur, Baja California				2	
Pauline	1997				Oaxaca				$448 million	230	
Rick	1997					Oaxaca				0	
Isis	1998					Sinaloa			$50 million	14	
Keith	2000					Tamaulipas			$365,938	23	
Isidore	2002			Yucatán					$950 million	17	
Kenna	2002		Nayarit						$96 million	4	
Erika	2003					Tamaulipas				2	
Ignacio	2003					Baja California Sur			$21.2 million	4	
Marty	2003					Baja California Sur			$81.8 million	12	
Emily	2005		Quintana Roo	Tamaulipas					$834 million	0	
Stan	2005					Veracruz	Quintana Roo		$1.28 billion	91	
Wilma	2005		Quintana Roo						$4.84 billion	8	
John	2006				Baja California Sur				$60.8 million	5	
Lane	2006			Sinaloa					$203 million	4	
Lorenzo	2007					Veracruz			$92 million	6	
Dean	2007	Quintana Roo			Veracruz				$184 million	13	
Henriette	2007					Baja California Sur	Sonora		$25 million	11	
Norbert	2008				Baja California Sur	Sonora			$84 million	25	
Jimena	2009				Baja California Sur			Baja California Sur	$174 million	9	
Alex	2010				Tamaulipas				$1.5 billion	12	
Karl	2010			Veracruz			Quintana Roo		$3.9 billion	22	
Jova	2011				Jalisco				$191 million	9	
Carlotta	2012				Oaxaca				$12.4 million	7	
Ernesto	2012				Quintana Roo		Veracruz		$174 million	12	
Barbara	2013					Chiapas			$358 million	3	
Ingrid	2013					Tamaulipas			$1.5 billion	32	
Manuel	2013					Sinaloa	Michoacán		$4.2 billion	123	
Odile	2014			Baja California Sur			Sonora		$1.25 billion	12	
Patricia	2015		Jalisco						$325 million	6	
Newton	2016					Baja California Sur	Sonora		$95 million	9	
Franklin	2017					Veracruz	Quintana Roo		$15 million	0	
Katia	2017					Veracruz			$3.26 million	3	
Max	2017					Guerrero			$76.4 million	4	
Willa	2018			Sinaloa					$820 million	9	
Lorena	2019					Jalisco, Baja California Sur			$100,000	1	
Gamma	2020					Quintana Roo		Quintana Roo	$100 million	6	
Delta	2020				Quintana Roo				$185 million	2	
Zeta	2020					Quintana Roo			$195,000	0	
Grace	2021			Veracruz		Quintana Roo			$300 million	9	
Nora	2021					Jalisco	Sinaloa		$193 million	3	
Olaf	2021				Baja California Sur				$10 million	1	
Pamela	2021					Sinaloa			$97 million	0	
Rick	2021				Guerrero				$26.1 million	1	
Agatha	2022				Oaxaca				$50 million	9	
Orlene	2022					Sinaloa			$600,000	0	
Roslyn	2022			Nayarit					$56.7 million	4	
Lidia	2023		Jalisco						$77.6 million	3	
Otis	2023	Guerrero							$12 billion	52	
Beryl	2024					Quintana Roo			$90 million	0	
John	2024			Guerrero			Michoacán		$2.45 billion	29	
Erick	2025			Oaxaca						2	
Polo	2026				Baja California Sur	Sonora					

== Climatological statistics ==
Number of hurricanes striking Mexico by month
Month	Number of hurricanes
May	3
June	12
July	12
August	41
September	65
October	47
November	3

Number of hurricanes striking Mexico by decade
Period	Number of hurricanes
1850s	3
1860s	2
1870s	3
1880s	8
1890s	4
1900s	4
1910s	1
1920s	3
1930s	9
1940s	7
1950s	20
1960s	12
1970s	15
1980s	15
1990s	23
2000s	19
2010s	17
2020s	18

== Superlatives ==
Wettest tropical cyclones and their remnants Mexico (Overall) Highest-known totals
Precipitation			Storm	Location	Ref.
Rank	mm	in	Storm	Location	Ref.
1	1576	62.05	Wilma 2005	Quintana Roo	
2	1442	56.8	John 2024	Acapulco	
3	1119	44.06	Frances 1998	Escuintla	
4	1107	43.6	Manuel 2013	Acapulco	
5	1098	43.23	TD 11 (1999)	Jalacingo	
6	1011	39.80	Juliette 2001	Cuadano/Santiago	
7	950	37.41	Dolly 1996	Igualapa	
8	941	37.06	Fifi 1974	Tlanchinol	
9	890	35.04	Alex 2010	Monterrey	
10	829	32.62	Pauline 1997	Puente Jula	

Strongest Mexico Hurricanes†
Rank	Name‡	Season	Wind Speed		Basin	Ref.
Rank	Name‡	Season	mph	km/h		
1	Janet	1955	175	280	Atlantic	
1	Dean	2007	175	280	Atlantic	
3	Gilbert	1988	160	260	Atlantic	
3	Otis	2023	160	260	Pacific	
5	Carmen	1974	155	250	Atlantic	
7	"Two"	1880	150	240	Atlantic	
7	Anita	1977	150	240	Atlantic	
7	Wilma	2005	150	240	Atlantic	
7	Patricia	2015	150	240	Pacific	
10	Madeline	1976	145	230	Pacific	
†Strength refers to maximum sustained wind speed upon striking land.
‡Systems prior to 1950 were not officially named.

Most Intense Mexico Hurricanes
Rank	Name	Season	Landfall Pressure	Basin	Ref.
1	Gilbert	1988	900 mbar (hPa)	Atlantic	
2	Dean	2007	905 mbar (hPa)	Atlantic	
3	Janet	1955	914 mbar (hPa)	Atlantic	
4	Anita	1977	926 mbar (hPa)	Atlantic	
5	Wilma	2005	927 mbar (hPa)	Atlantic	
6	Otis	2023	929 mbar (hPa)	Pacific	
7	"Two"	1880	931 mbar (hPa)	Atlantic	
9	Carmen	1974	933 mbar (hPa)	Atlantic	
9	Patricia	2015	933 mbar (hPa)	Pacific	
10	Isidore	2002	936 mbar (hPa)	Atlantic	
Intensity is measured solely by central pressure

== See also ==
- List of United States hurricanes
- List of Belize hurricanes
