= Hurricane Tara =

Category 1 Pacific hurricane in 1961

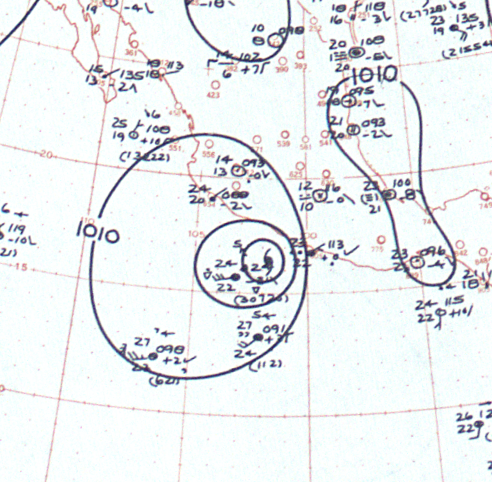
- Surface weather analysis of the storm near peak intensity

Meteorological history
- Formed: November 10, 1961
- Dissipated: November 12, 1961

Category 1 hurricane
- 1-minute sustained (SSHWS/NWS)
- Highest winds: 85 mph (140 km/h)
- Lowest pressure: 996 mbar (hPa); 29.41 inHg

Overall effects
- Fatalities: 436 total
- Damage: $16 million (1961 USD)
- Areas affected: Southern Mexico
- IBTrACS
- Part of the 1961 Pacific hurricane season

Hurricane Tara was one of the deadliest Pacific hurricanes on record. The final tropical cyclone of the 1961 Pacific hurricane season, Tara formed on November 10 about 230 mi (365 km) off the coast of Mexico. It strengthened to reach maximum sustained winds of 85 mph (140 km/h) before making landfall in the Mexican state of Guerrero near Zihuatanejo. Hurricane Tara dissipated on November 12, bringing heavy rainfall and strong winds to locations inundated by 10 days of precipitation. Damage was light in the major port city of Acapulco, though further west along the coast, the effects of Tara were much worse. The city of Nuxco in Tecpan de Galeana municipality received the most damage and deaths from the hurricane. Throughout Mexico, at least 436 fatalities were reported, and damage exceeded $16 million (1961 USD, $115 million 2009 USD).

== Meteorological history ==
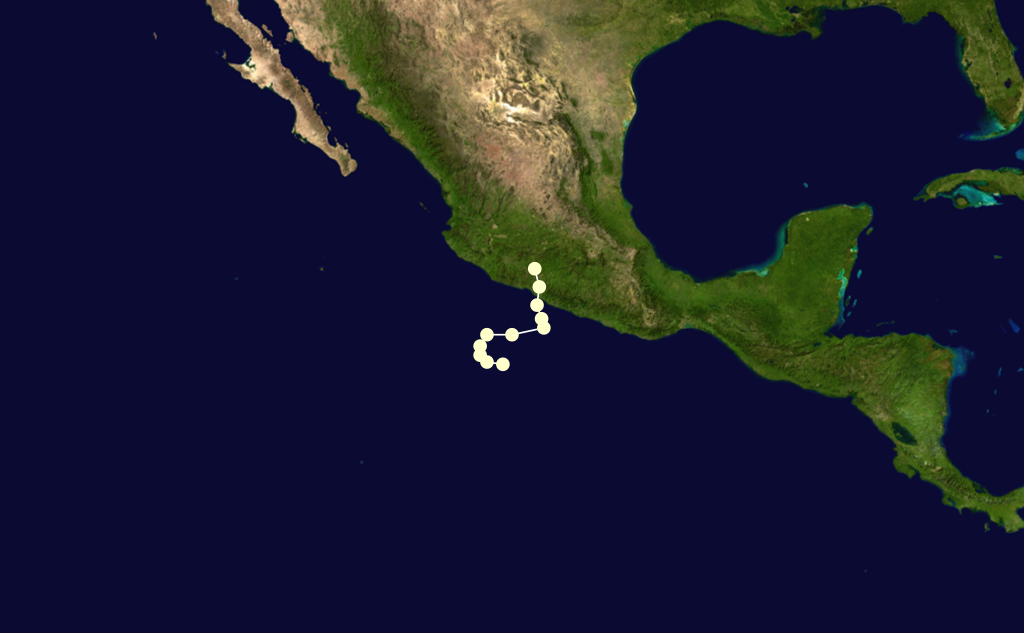
Map plotting the storm's track and intensity, according to the Saffir–Simpson scale Map key Saffir–Simpson scale Tropical depression (≤38 mph, ≤62 km/h) Tropical storm (39–73 mph, 63–118 km/h) Category 1 (74–95 mph, 119–153 km/h) Category 2 (96–110 mph, 154–177 km/h) Category 3 (111–129 mph, 178–208 km/h) Category 4 (130–156 mph, 209–251 km/h) Category 5 (≥157 mph, ≥252 km/h) Unknown Storm type Tropical cyclone Subtropical cyclone Extratropical cyclone, remnant low, tropical disturbance, or monsoon depression

On November 9, a weak circulation remained nearly stationary off the coast of Acapulco, Mexico. While the system did not have significant convection, it organized enough to be considered a tropical cyclone at 0000 UTC on November 10, about 230 mi (365 km) off the coast of Mexico. By the afternoon of the 10th, it was a tropical depression moving northeastward toward the coastline. Tara intensified, reaching hurricane status and its peak intensity of 85 mph (140 km/h) late on November 11. Early on November 12, Hurricane Tara made landfall near Zihuatanejo, Guerrero, between Acapulco and Manzanillo, near where Hurricane Iva moved ashore five months earlier. Continuing inland, it was last observed at 1200 UTC on November 12. At the time, it was known as Cyclone Tara, as the term cyclone was the more common equivalent for hurricane in the region.

== Impact and aftermath ==
Known Pacific hurricanes that have killed at least 100 people
Hurricane	Season	Fatalities	Ref.
"Mexico"	1959	1,800	
Paul	1982	1,625	
Liza	1976	1,263	
Tara	1961	436	
Pauline	1997	230–400	
Agatha	2010	204	
Manuel	2013	169	
Tico	1983	141	
Ismael	1995	116	
"Lower California"	1931	110	
"Mazatlán"	1943	100	
Lidia	1981	100	

Hurricane Tara caused severe damage in southern Guerrero where it moved ashore, wrecking at least 10 communities. Heavy rainfall from Tara exacerbated flooding in the area, which was caused by ten days of precipitation preceding the hurricane; the heavy rainfall contaminated drinking water. Strong waves killed a surfer in the Acapulco area. In the city, low-lying areas were inundated with water, causing in excess of $1 million in damage (1961 USD). In nearby Tecpan de Galeana, the hurricane killed 116 people, and dozens more were killed in other close villages. Elsewhere in Guerrero, the coastal highway between Acapulco and Zihuatanejo received heavy damage, which later hampered relief efforts; the highway was a priority for storm repairs, with crews working continuously for several days to restore the vital link. Many deaths were reported in coastal towns of Guerrero, although exact death tolls were initially unknown, with many of the towns covered in mud. People received little warning of the hurricane, and many people died while sleeping. In addition, thousands were left homeless by the storm. According to radio reports, a hurricane-related waterspout wrecked the city of Nuxco, although the damage was later described as flooding from a lagoon; 225 deaths were reported in Nuxco. Food supplies were depleted in some coastal communities, forcing residents to rely on coconuts that were downed during the hurricane. Overall crop damage in Mexico was unofficially estimated at $16 million (1961 USD, $115 million 2009 USD).

By two days after the storm, the government of Mexico sent two airplanes to Acapulco, where the food, clothing, and medicine were distributed by truck or helicopter to the affected areas. The Mexican government arranged plans to drop food and medical aid into isolated villages, although food supplies were initially insufficient for the great number of people affected by the storm. Five army units and three helicopters were sent to the region to assist in the aftermath, although planes encountered difficulties in landing due to flooded runways. Army soldiers were responsible for rescue operations, while paratroopers were sent to the most affected areas to distribute aid. Despite fears of the spread of disease in the aftermath, prompt work by medical officials prevented any epidemics due to the storm.

The exact death toll was unknown, but believed to be several hundred. About two days after the storm, the official death toll was more than 80. By three days after the storm, the toll rose to 190, and by four days after it made landfall, the official total was 290 deaths; officials estimated the toll could have exceeded 500. Due to downed communications, reports of storm fatalities were slow to spread, though news became more rapid as links were repaired. On November 19, a week after the storm struck, the Mexican Army set the final death toll at 436 deaths, with 300 missing; the death toll was later reported by the United States Office of Foreign Disaster Assistance in 1993. Overall, Hurricane Tara was the deadliest disaster in 1961, as well as the fourth deadliest Mexico Pacific hurricane on record, after a hurricane in 1959, Hurricane Liza in 1976 and Hurricane Paul in 1982.

== See also ==
- List of Category 1 Pacific hurricanes
- List of Mexico hurricanes
