= 1943 Mazatlán hurricane =

Pacific hurricane in 1943

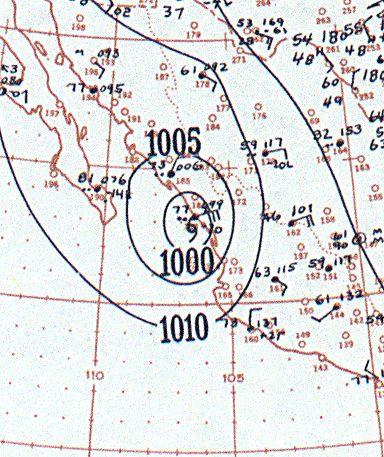
- Surface analysis of the hurricane near landfall

Meteorological history
- Formed: ≤8 October 1943
- Dissipated: 9 October 1943

Category 4 major hurricane
- 1-minute sustained (SSHWS)
- Highest winds: ≥135 mph (≥215 km/h)
- Lowest pressure: ≤958.6 mbar (hPa); ≤28.31 inHg

Overall effects
- Fatalities: at least 100
- Damage: $4.5 million
- Areas affected: southern coastal Sinaloa
- Part of the 1942–1948 Pacific hurricane seasons

The 1943 Mazatlán hurricane was a powerful Pacific hurricane that struck the Mexican state of Sinaloa in October 1943. It originated off the Pacific coast of Mexico, and became an intense hurricane, with maximum sustained winds of at least 136 miles per hour (219 km/h), equivalent to a Category 4 on the Saffir–Simpson scale. The hurricane made landfall just south of Mazatlán on October 9, becoming the strongest on record to strike the city. An observatory in the city recorded a minimum pressure of 958.6 millibars (28.31 inHg).

The hurricane severely damaged a 50 mi (80 km) portion of western Mexico, from Nayarit to Sinaloa. In Mazatlán, the communications were severed due to the strong winds, and the city briefly relied on a single Pan Am plane carrying American filmmaker Walt Disney. The hurricane killed at least 100 people and left over 1,000 homeless. Total damage was estimated at $4.5 million (1943 US$).

== Meteorological history ==
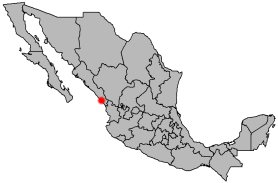
Location of Mazatlán within Mexico

On October 8, a tropical cyclone developed west of Mexico, between the Revillagigedo Islands and Islas Marías. Moving to the northeast, the system became a powerful hurricane before it moved ashore. At 15:30 UTC on 9 October, the hurricane made landfall just south of Mazatlán, in the Mexican state of Sinaloa. The Mazatlán Observatory recorded a minimum atmospheric pressure of 958.6 millibars (28.31 inHg) and maximum sustained winds of 134 mph (216 km/h) over 15 minutes, before the anemometer broke loose. The wind speed is equivalent to a Category 4 on the Saffir–Simpson scale. It was the strongest hurricane on record to strike the city. Soon after moving ashore, the hurricane rapidly weakened, dissipating over the mountainous terrain of northwestern Mexico. The remnants of the hurricane later moved through the Mexican state of Chihuahua, heading toward the southern United States.

== Effects ==
Known Pacific hurricanes that have killed at least 100 people
Hurricane	Season	Fatalities	Ref.
"Mexico"	1959	1,800	
Paul	1982	1,625	
Liza	1976	1,263	
Tara	1961	436	
Pauline	1997	230–400	
Agatha	2010	204	
Manuel	2013	169	
Tico	1983	141	
Ismael	1995	116	
"Lower California"	1931	110	
"Mazatlán"	1943	100	
Lidia	1981	100	

The hurricane struck Mazatlán with sustained winds of at least 134 mph (216 km/h), with little warning. The hurricane produced little rainfall in the city, which recorded just 2 in (51 mm) of precipitation. High waves lashed the coast, damaging homes and hotels along the waterfront. Offshore, there were several fishing boats, as well as a Mexican Navy vessel caught in the storm; no trace was reportedly found; all persons aboard these vessels apparently died. A small coastal boat arrived in the port of Mazatlán after the storm and reported six crew members missing. The hurricane destroyed about 60% of the buildings in Mazatlán, including 3,000 homes, leaving thousands homeless in the city. The storm also caused severe damage in nearby Villa Unión, estimated at US$4.5 million. The hurricane killed at least 100 people.

Shortly before the peak of the hurricane, Pan Am grounded all of its airlines. A plane from Los Angeles landed in Mazatlán and rode out the storm, with 21 passengers on board. The passengers included filmmaker Walt Disney, his family, and employees, headed to Mexico City for production on The Three Caballeros. After the storm, the plane was the only means of communicating with the rest of the world for about 18 hours, after the airport's radio towers were damaged. The storm also damaged all telephone and telegraph lines in the city, as well as the airport's hangar and administration building. Throughout the state of Sinaloa, the storm overflowed rivers and destroyed warehouses, ruining most of the crops in the state. The hurricane caused severe damage along a 50 mi (80 km) portion of the Mexican coastline, from Acaponeta, Nayarit, northward to Mazatlán. In Guadalajara, the hurricane tore the roofs of houses while also causing flooding. The city's power plant was shut down. Storm damage disrupted train service for the Southern Pacific Transportation Company between Nogales and Guadalajara. The storm damaged water systems, leaving people without potable water or sewage systems.

== Aftermath ==
Within a day of the hurricane, Mexican President Manuel Ávila Camacho ordered nurses and doctors on standby, and for military workers in the area to prepare to assist in the aftermath. By two days after the hurricane's landfall, water access was restored at a limited capacity for only two hours a day. By five days after the storm, officials had restored power and communications in the area. Around the same time, the president issued an appeal for public donations for storm victims. Within a week, citizens sent large quantities of food, clothing, and medicine to the worst affected areas. The President of Mexico personally visited Mazatlán with other officials, bringing aid in the form of medicine and clothing. A group of Mexican Americans in California raised nearly $27,000 for relief efforts.

== See also ==
- Hurricane Olivia (1975) – a major hurricane that hit the city in 1975
- Hurricane Tico (1983) – a major hurricane that struck near Mazatlan
