= Hurricane Paul =

Category 2 Pacific hurricane in 1982

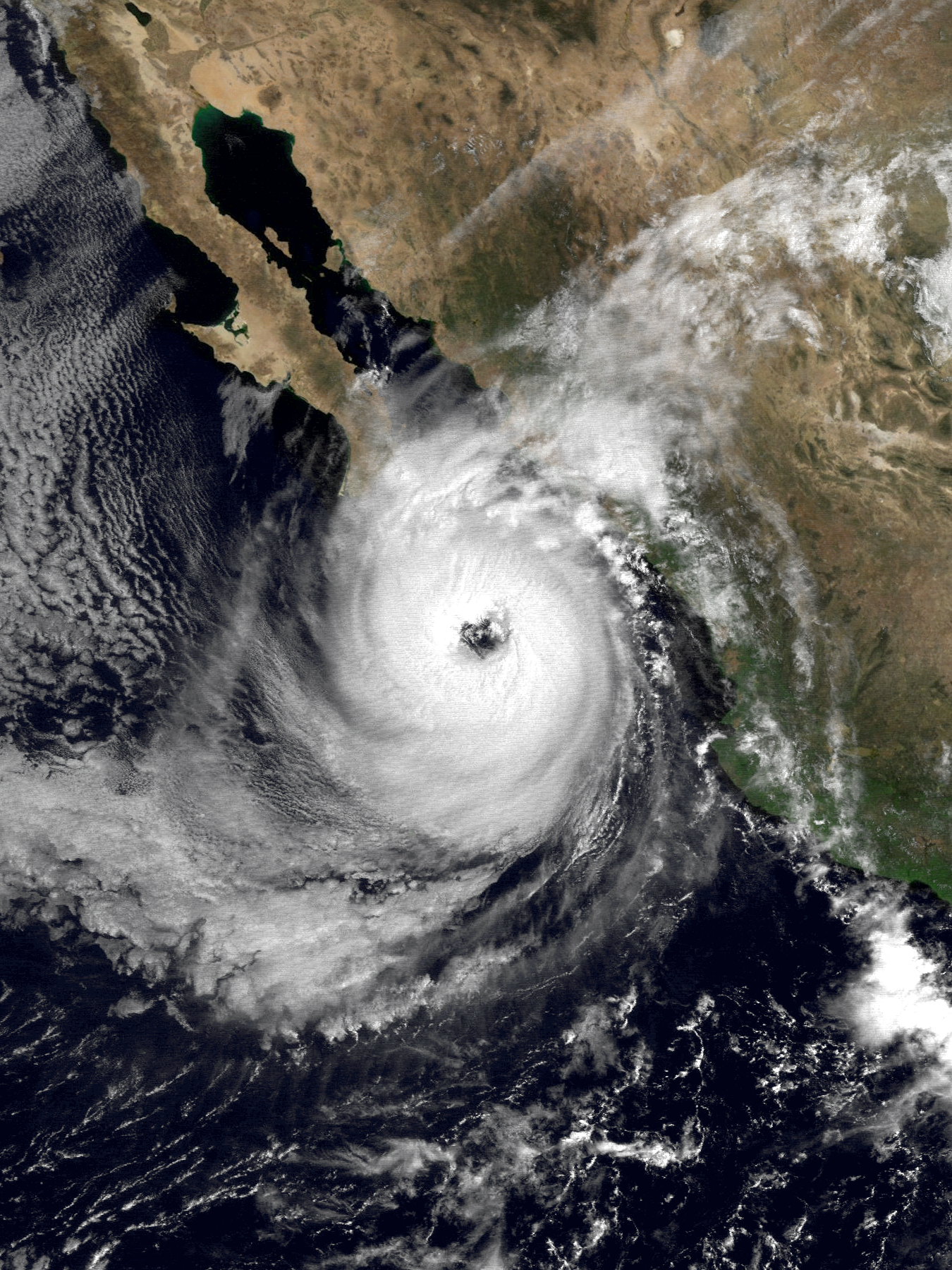
- Hurricane Paul at peak intensity prior to landfall on the Baja California Peninsula on September 28

Meteorological history
- Formed: September 18, 1982
- Dissipated: September 30, 1982

Category 2 hurricane
- 1-minute sustained (SSHWS/NWS)
- Highest winds: 110 mph (175 km/h)

Overall effects
- Fatalities: 1,625 total (Second deadliest East Pacific hurricane)
- Missing: 668
- Damage: $520 million (1982 USD)
- Areas affected: Guatemala, El Salvador, Baja California, Northwest Mexico, United States
- IBTrACS
- Part of the 1982 Pacific hurricane season

Hurricane Paul was a devastating tropical cyclone which killed a total of 1,625 people and caused US$520 million in damage, ranking it as the second deadliest Pacific hurricane on record, behind the 1959 Mexico Hurricane. The sixteenth named storm and tenth hurricane of the 1982 Pacific hurricane season, Paul developed as a tropical depression just offshore Central America on September 18. The depression briefly moved inland two days later just before heading westward out to sea. The storm changed little in strength for several days until September 25, when it slowly intensified into a tropical storm. Two days later, Paul attained hurricane status, and further strengthened to Category 2 intensity after turning northward. The hurricane then accelerated toward the northeast, reaching peak winds of 110 mph (175 km/h). Paul made landfall over Baja California Sur on September 29, and subsequently moved ashore in Sinaloa the next day.

Prior to making landfall near the El Salvador–Guatemala border as a tropical depression, the precursor disturbance dropped heavy rainfall over the region, which later continued after landfall. Many rivers in the region burst their banks after five days of rainfall, causing severe flooding and multiple mudslides. Throughout Central America, at least 1,363 people were killed, with most of the fatalities occurring in El Salvador, although some occurred in Guatemala. Another 225 deaths were attributed to floods from the depression in southern Mexico. In addition, Paul was responsible for 24 fatalities and moderate damage in northwestern Mexico, where it made landfall at hurricane strength. Despite the catastrophic damage and loss of life caused by the storm, the name Paul was not retired following the season.

== Meteorological history ==
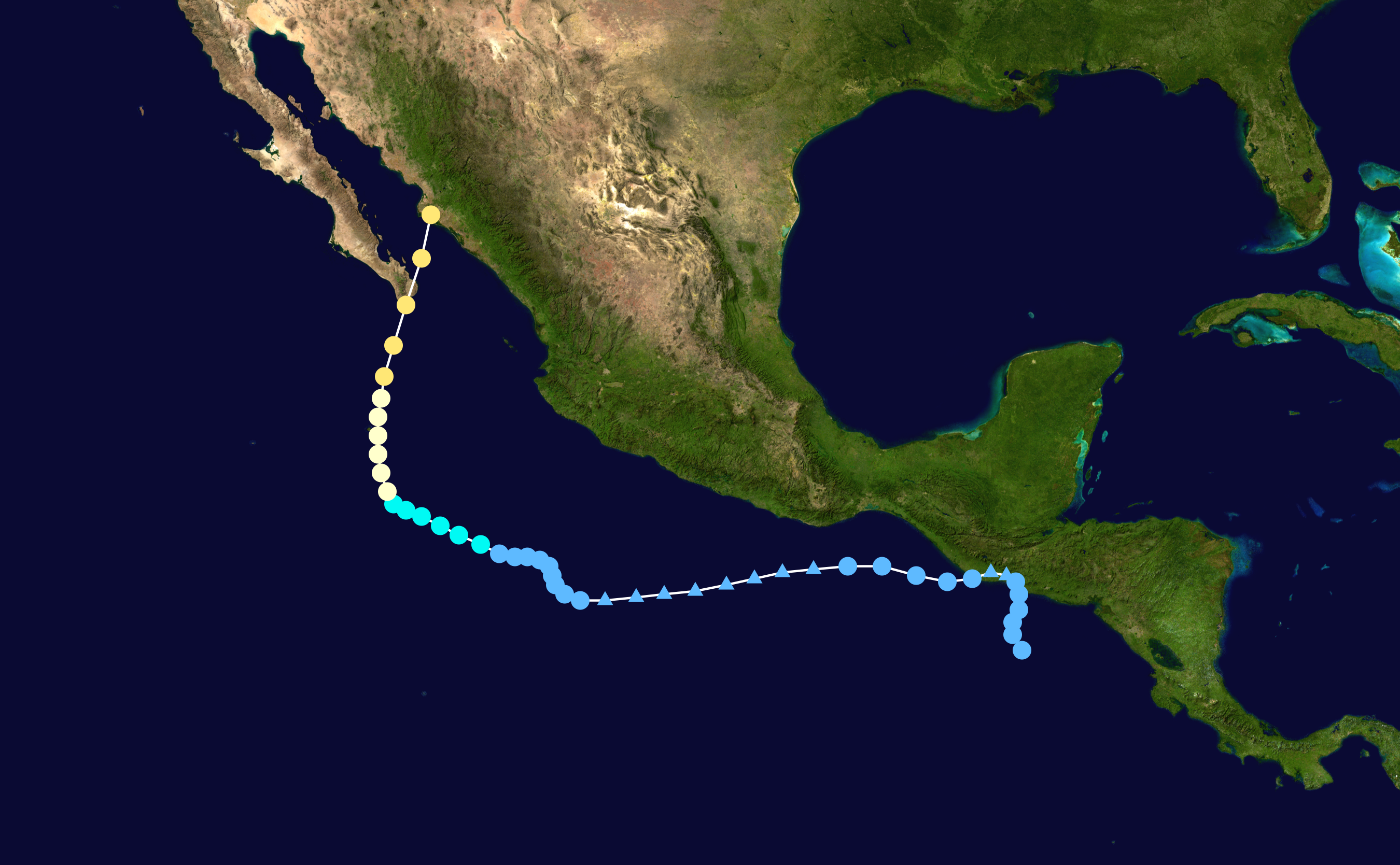
Map plotting the storm's track and intensity, according to the Saffir–Simpson scale Map key Saffir–Simpson scale Tropical depression (≤38 mph, ≤62 km/h) Tropical storm (39–73 mph, 63–118 km/h) Category 1 (74–95 mph, 119–153 km/h) Category 2 (96–110 mph, 154–177 km/h) Category 3 (111–129 mph, 178–208 km/h) Category 4 (130–156 mph, 209–251 km/h) Category 5 (≥157 mph, ≥252 km/h) Unknown Storm type Tropical cyclone Subtropical cyclone Extratropical cyclone, remnant low, tropical disturbance, or monsoon depression

The precursor disturbance to Paul originated from an area of low barometric pressure and disorganized thunderstorms, which was first noted near the Pacific coast of Honduras on September 15. Several days later, satellite imagery indicated it had developed a center of cyclonic circulation; on 1800 UTC September 20, the Eastern Pacific Hurricane Center initiated advisories on the system and classified it as Tropical Depression Twenty-Two. At that time, it was located 200 mi (320 km) southwest of Tegucigalpa, Honduras and supported winds of 35 mph (50 km/h). The depression turned northward in response to a weak steering flow between two high pressure systems—one near Cabo San Lucas and the other west of Central America. It then moved inland near the El Salvador–Guatemala border, and dissipated overland.

Under the influence of a persistent stationary trough near California, the remains of the depression retraced westward back over the open waters of the Pacific. Advisories on the system were resumed late on September 20. Though it was reconsidered a tropical cyclone, its wind circulation was poorly defined; the depression again degenerated into an open trough at 0000 UTC September 22. Its forward motion remained relatively unchanged for several days, and by September 24 the system was reclassified as a tropical cyclone. After briefly drifting northward, the system began tracking toward the west-northwest. It gradually organized into a tropical storm at 0000 UTC September 25. Since it was then situated over favorable sea surface temperatures between 28 °C (82 °F) and 29 °C (84 °F), Paul underwent a phase of rapid intensification. This allowed it to reach Category 1 hurricane strength on the Saffir-Simpson hurricane wind scale (SSHWS) just two days after its naming.

Upon becoming a hurricane, Paul turned to the north and continued to develop. As the storm neared Baja California Sur, it reached Category 2 intensity. An upper-level trough forced the hurricane to accelerate towards the northeast, at which point it had reached peak wind speeds of 110 mph (180 km/h). From 1800 to 2100 UTC on September 29, the eye of the hurricane made landfall along Baja California Sur, moving ashore less than 100 mi (160 km) south of La Paz near San José del Cabo. After weakening slightly inland, Paul briefly reemerged over water and subsequently made its final landfall near Los Mochis, Sinaloa with winds of 100 mph (165 km/h). Tropical cyclone advisories were discontinued shortly thereafter, though exact information on the storm after it moved inland is unavailable due to a lack of data completion in the hurricane database.

== Preparations ==
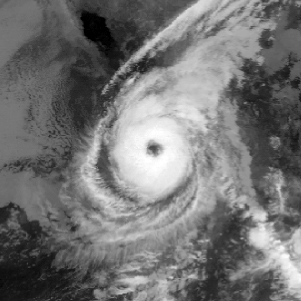
Hurricane Paul after landfall.

An alert was issued for the Mexican states of Sonora and Sinaloa and Baja California Sur; army and navy units were on standby in case of an emergency. Roughly 50,000 people evacuated to storm shelters and thousands of others sought refuge in public buildings, such as schools and churches. Across La Paz, officials evacuated 3,000 families from hurricane-prone areas. In the towns of Altata and Guamúchil alone, army officials evacuated 5,000 coastal residents.

== Impact ==
=== El Salvador ===
Known Pacific hurricanes that have killed at least 100 people
| Hurricane | Season | Fatalities | Ref. |
|---|---|---|---|
| "Mexico" | 1959 | 1,800 | |
| Paul | 1982 | 1,625 | |
| Liza | 1976 | 1,263 | |
| Tara | 1961 | 436 | |
| Pauline | 1997 | 230–400 | |
| Agatha | 2010 | 204 | |
| Manuel | 2013 | 169 | |
| Tico | 1983 | 141 | |
| Ismael | 1995 | 116 | |
| "Lower California" | 1931 | 110 | |
| "Mazatlán" | 1943 | 100 | |
| Lidia | 1981 | 100 | |

The tropical depression that later became Paul produced the worst natural disaster in El Salvador history since 1965. Although the death toll was initially believed to be lower it rose to a final toll of 761 after new victims were confirmed on September 28. Of these deaths, 312 occurred in the capital city of San Salvador, which had also sustained the worst damage. Another 40 people perished in Actoo, a very small village located 42 mi (68 km) west of San Salvador. Rescue workers searched through rocks and mud to find missing victims. About 25,000–30,000 people were left homeless. Much of San Salvador was submerged by flood waters of up to 8 ft (2.4 m) high, and even after their recession hundreds of homes remained buried under trees, debris, and 10 ft (3.0 m) of mud. In all, property damage from the storm amounted to $100 million in the country; while crop damage amounted to $250 million.

=== Guatemala, and southern Mexico ===
In Guatemala, widespread catastrophic floods claimed 615 lives and left 668 others missing. More than 10,000 people were left homeless in the wake of the disaster. According to the highway department, the storm destroyed 16 bridges which left 200 communities isolated from surrounding areas. Overall, economic losses of $100 million (1982 USD) were reported in the country. Throughout southern Mexico, floods from the precursor depression to Paul killed another 225 people.

=== Baja California Sur ===
Hurricane Paul produced heavy rainfall along its path through Baja California Sur. At least 85 homes in La Paz sustained damage, and many telephone lines in the region were down at the height of the storm. Wind gusts estimated at 120 mph (195 km/h) swept through San José del Cabo, causing property damage and subsequently leaving 9,000 homeless. Despite the damage, no deaths were reported in the wake of Paul.

=== Northwest Mexico and southwest United States ===
Upon making its final landfall in Sinaloa, Paul produced hurricane-force winds recorded at 100 mph (160 km/h) in Los Mochis. The winds demolished numerous homes in the region, leaving 140,000 residents homeless and another 400,000 people isolated. The greatest damage occurred 70 miles (110 km) south of Los Mochis in the city of Guamuchil; some houses suffered total destruction, while many other had their roof blown off. A total of 24 people were killed by the storm, although it produced beneficial rains over the region.

The worst flooding occurred near the Rio Sinaloa; 7.9 in (200 mm) to 12 in (300 mm) of rain fell in some locations. Over 25,000 homes were damaged. Agricultural damage was severe in the state of Sinaloa, with up to 40 percent of the soybean crop destroyed. Sugar cane, tomato, and rice crops also sustained damage from the hurricane, and in its wake the state's corn production was down by 26 percent from the previous year. Total storm damage in Mexico amounted to $4.5 billion (1982 MXN; $70 million USD).

The remnants of Paul moved into the United States, producing heavy rainfall in southern New Mexico and extreme West Texas. Inclement weather was observed as far inland as the Great Plains. A combination of rain and snow moved into Colorado; 6 in (150 mm) of snow was expected in Wyoming, thus winter storm warnings were required for parts of the state.

== Aftermath ==
In the aftermath of the storm, the Government of El Salvador was criticized for failing to keep the public well informed. It provided over $300,000 in aid and declared a state of emergency; additionally, a state of mourning was declared. The United Nations World Food program began distributing food set aside for victims of the El Salvador Civil War. The U.S. Embassy in Guatemala provided $25,000 in aid for the country. Mexican authorities rushed to supply food and water to the homeless.

== See also ==
- List of Category 2 Pacific hurricanes
- List of the deadliest tropical cyclones
