= 1895 Atlantic hurricane season =

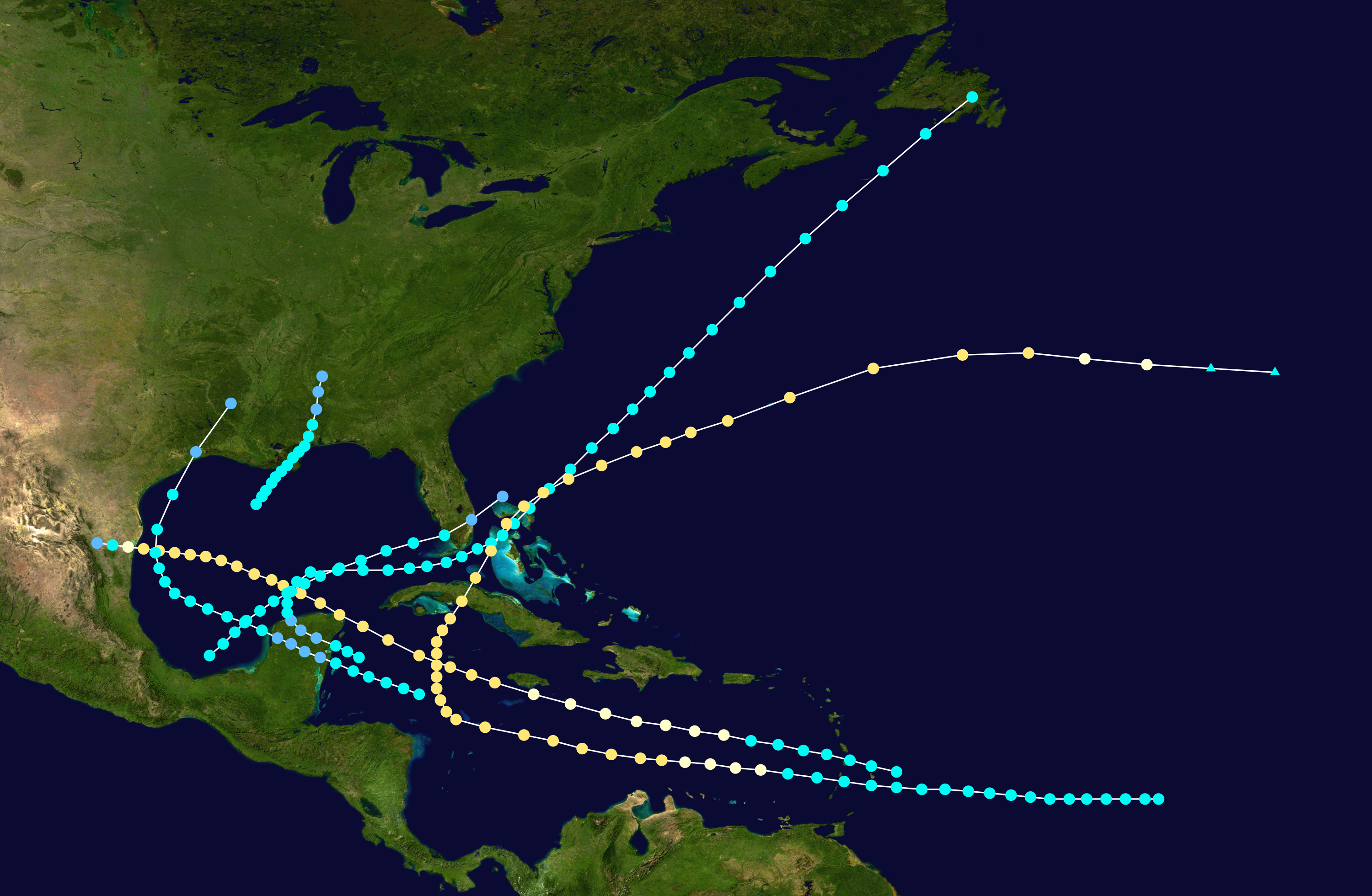
- Season summary map

Seasonal boundaries
- First system formed: August 14, 1895
- Last system dissipated: October 26, 1895

Strongest storm
- Name: Two
  - Maximum winds: 110 mph (175 km/h) (1-minute sustained)
  - Lowest pressure: 963 mbar (hPa; 28.44 inHg)

Seasonal statistics
- Total storms: 6
- Hurricanes: 2
- Total fatalities: 56
- Total damage: > $1 million (1895 USD)

Related article
- 1890s North Indian Ocean cyclone seasons

The 1895 Atlantic hurricane season was a fairly inactive one, featuring only six known tropical cyclones, although each of them made landfall. Of those six systems, only two intensified a hurricane, while none of those strengthened into a major hurricane. (Note: A major hurricane is a storm that ranks as Category 3 or higher on the Saffir–Simpson hurricane wind scale.) However, in the absence of modern satellite and other remote-sensing technologies, only storms that affected populated land areas or encountered ships at sea were recorded, so the actual total could be higher. An undercount bias of zero to six tropical cyclones per year between 1851 and 1885 and zero to four per year between 1886 and 1910 has been estimated.

During their respective reassessments of the season, neither meteorologists José Fernández-Partagás and Henry F. Diaz in 1996 nor the Atlantic hurricane reanalysis project added or removed any storms from official hurricane database (HURDAT). However, the latter retroactively downgraded the fifth system from a major hurricane to a Category 2 storm on the present-day Saffir–Simpson scale. A reanalysis study by climate researcher Michael Chenoweth, published in 2014, concluded that 10 tropical cyclones formed in the Atlantic in 1895, suggesting the removal of two storms from HURDAT and the addition to six storms. However, the changes suggested in Chenoweth's study have yet to be included in HURDAT.

On August 14, ships detected the season's first known cyclone over the Gulf of Mexico. The storm struck Louisiana and Mississippi, producing rains and winds along the Gulf Coast of the United States and in Georgia. Later that month, the second storm caused at least $1 million (1895 USD) in damage in northeastern Mexico alone. (Note: All damage figures are in 1895 USD, unless otherwise noted) The track for the season's third system begins on September 28 over the northwestern Caribbean Sea. Although it crossed the Yucatán Peninsula and the Bahamas after moving near the Florida Keys, the cyclone most severely impacted Cuba, where 56 deaths occurred. In mid-October, the fifth storm of the season also impacted Cuba, Florida, and the Bahamas, as well as Bermuda, with an unknown number of people killed in Cuba. The storm likely became extratropical on October 26 to the southwest of the Azores.

== Season summary ==
The Atlantic hurricane database (HURDAT) officially recognizes that six tropical cyclones formed during the 1895 season, two of which strengthened into a hurricane, with none of those intensifying into a major hurricane. The Atlantic hurricane reanalysis project did not add or remove any storms from the 1996 reanalysis of the season by meteorologists José Fernández-Partagás and Henry F. Diaz, although the former downgraded the fifth storm from major hurricane status. However, a more recent reanalysis by climate researcher Michael Chenoweth, published in 2014, adds six storms and removes two – the fourth and sixth systems – for a net gain of four cyclones, although these proposed changes have yet to be approved for inclusion to HURDAT. Chenoweth's study utilizes a more extensive collection of newspapers and ship logs, as well as late 19th century weather maps for the first time, in comparison to previous reanalysis projects. Chenoweth's proposals have yet to be incorporated into HURDAT, however.

Ships detected the season's first known cyclone on August 14 over the Gulf of Mexico. Striking Louisiana and Mississippi, the storm dissipated on August 17. Later in August, the second cyclone traversed the Caribbean before striking the Yucatán Peninsula on August 27 as a hurricane and then making another landfall in Mexico in Tamaulipas on August 30. On September 28, the track for the season's third system begins in the northwestern Caribbean Sea. Remaining a tropical storm, the cyclone struck the Yucatán Peninsula, the Bahamas, and Newfoundland before dissipating on October 7. The final three known tropical cyclones developed in October, with the first and third of those storms remaining minimal tropical storms. However, the second October storm – the fifth Atlantic cyclone of the year – struck Cuba and the Bahamas and moved near or over Bermuda at hurricane intensity until transitioning into an extratropical cyclone on October 26, concluding seasonal activity.

The season's activity was reflected with an accumulated cyclone energy (ACE) rating of 69, the third lowest total of the decade. ACE is a metric used to express the energy used by a tropical cyclone during its lifetime. Therefore, a storm with a longer duration will have higher values of ACE. It is only calculated at six-hour increments in which specific tropical and subtropical systems are either at or above sustained wind speeds of 39 mph (63 km/h), which is the threshold for tropical storm intensity. Thus, tropical depressions are not included here.

== Systems ==
=== Tropical Storm One ===
- Tropical storm (SSHWS)
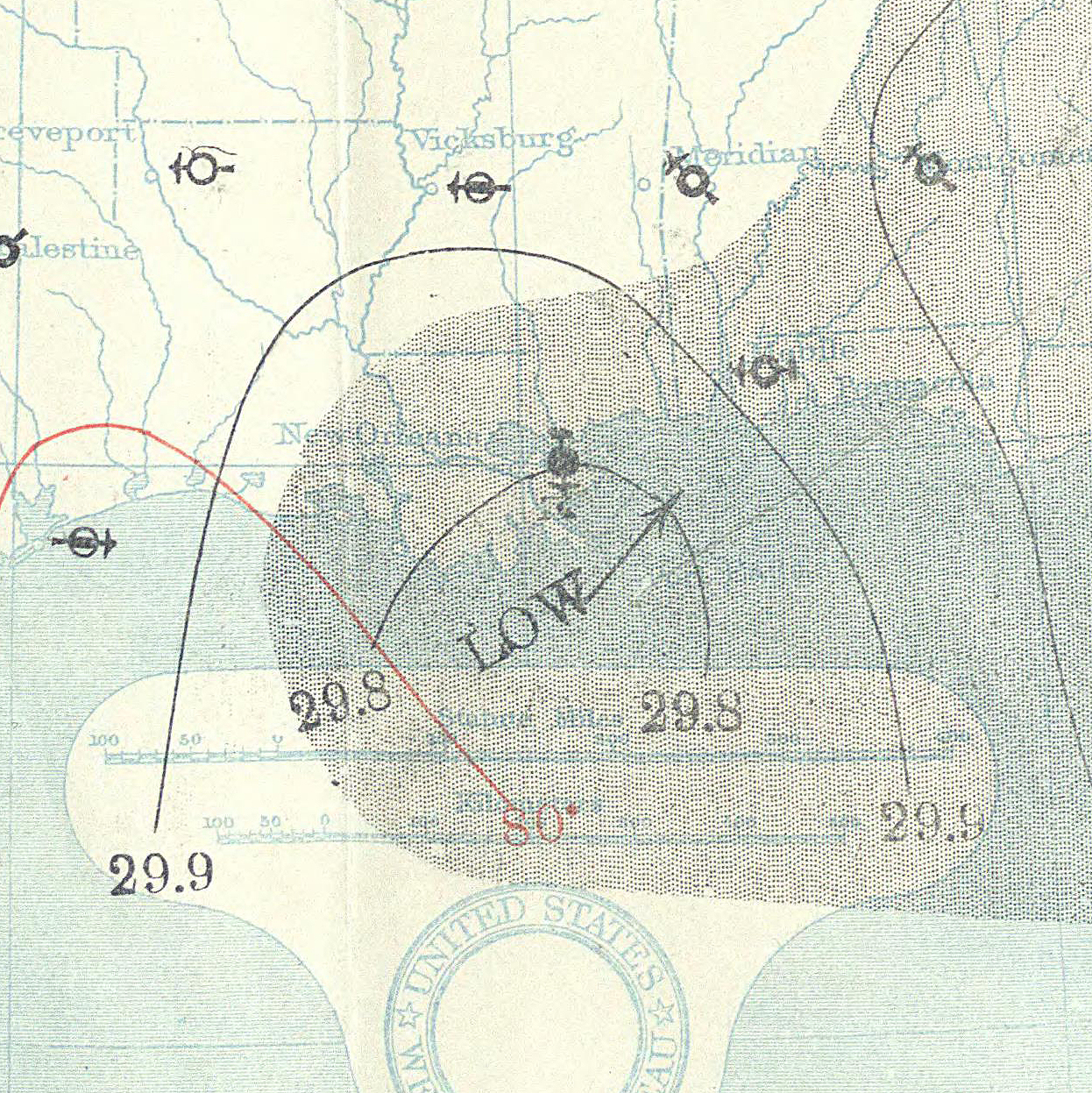
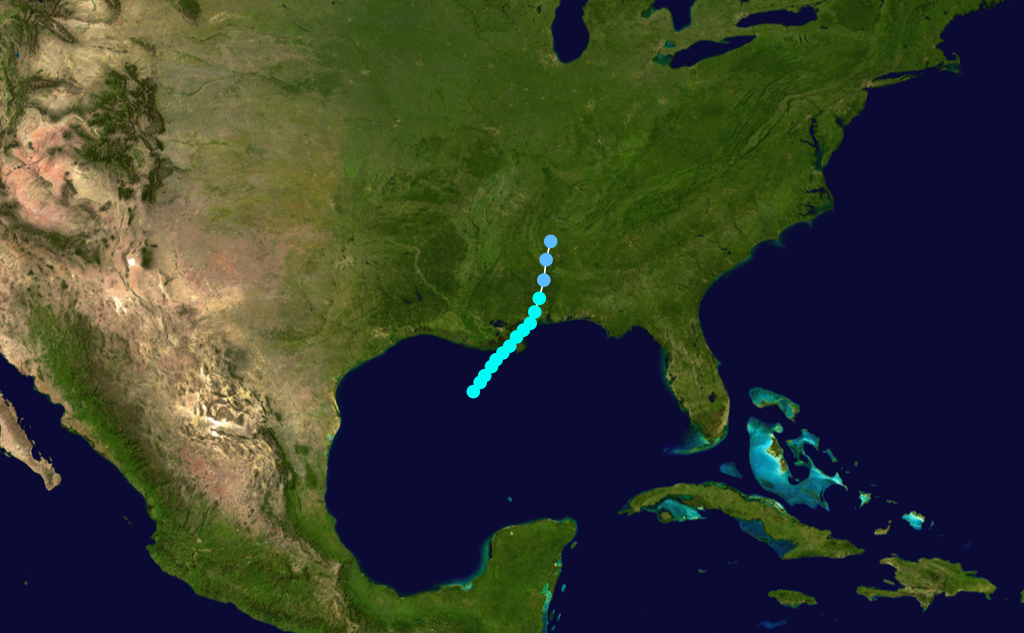
- Duration: August 14 – August 17
- Peak intensity: 60 mph (95 km/h) (1-min); ≤1009 mbar (hPa)

Ships detected a tropical storm over the north-central Gulf of Mexico on August 14. Peaking with sustained winds of 60 mph (95 km/h), the cyclone struck Buras, Louisiana, at 19:00 UTC the following day. The storm then re-emerged into the Gulf of Mexico and made landfall in Mississippi on Horn Island around 13:00 UTC on August 16 and then the mainland between Ocean Springs and Pascagoula. After moving inland, the system weakened to a tropical depression and dissipated over Alabama on August 17. Climate researcher Michael Chenoweth proposed shifting the track slightly farther west in a 2014 reanalysis study but suggested few other changes.

As a result of the storm, New Orleans, Louisiana, recorded sustained winds of 30 mph (48 km/h), while Pensacola, Florida, observed sustained winds reaching 48 mph (77 km/h). A weather station in Louisiana recorded 4.2 in (110 mm) of rainfall in 24 hours, while about 2 to 4 in (51 to 102 mm) of precipitation fell from there into Georgia, causing damage to cotton crops.

=== Hurricane Two ===
- Category 2 hurricane (SSHWS)
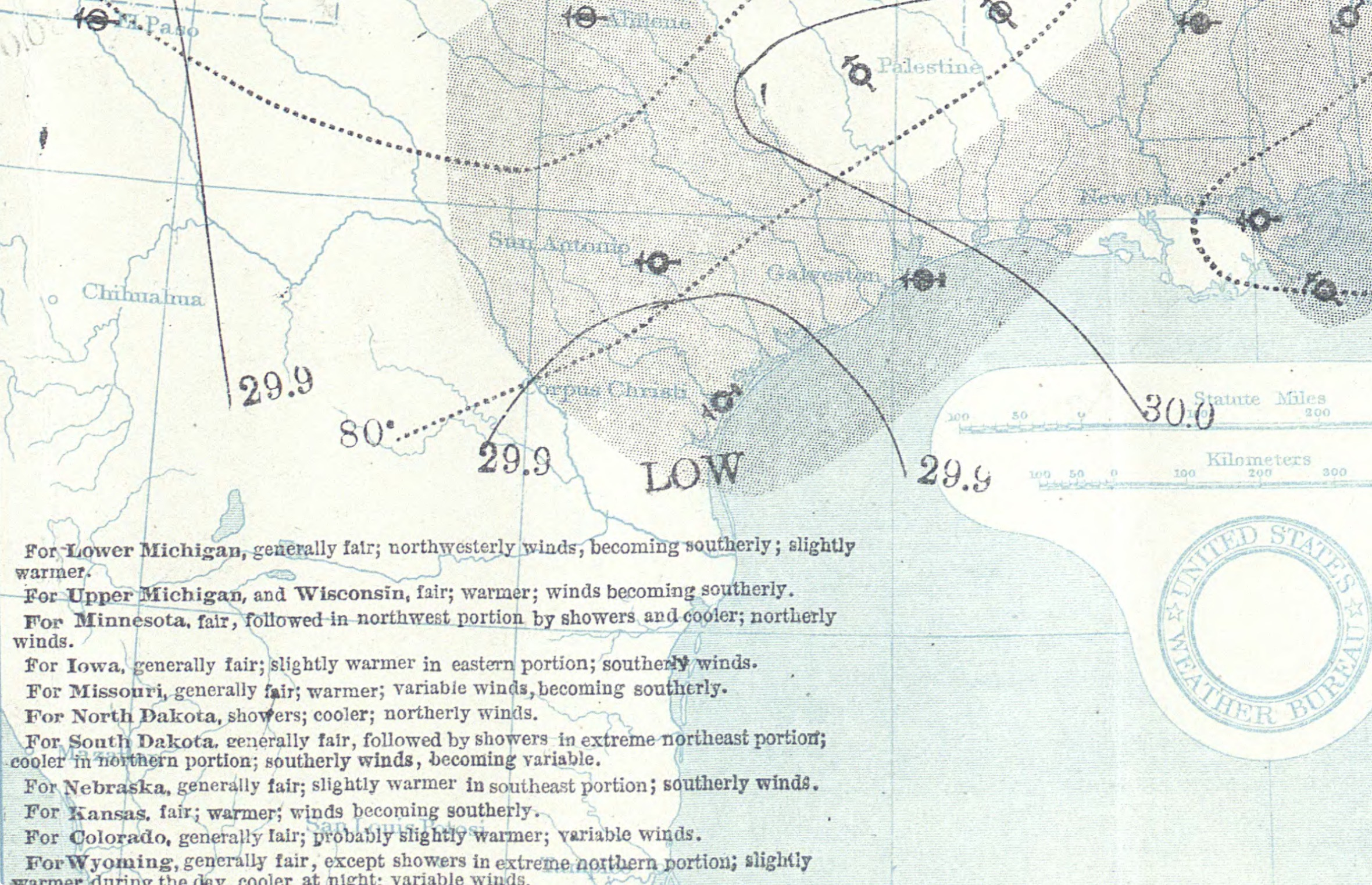
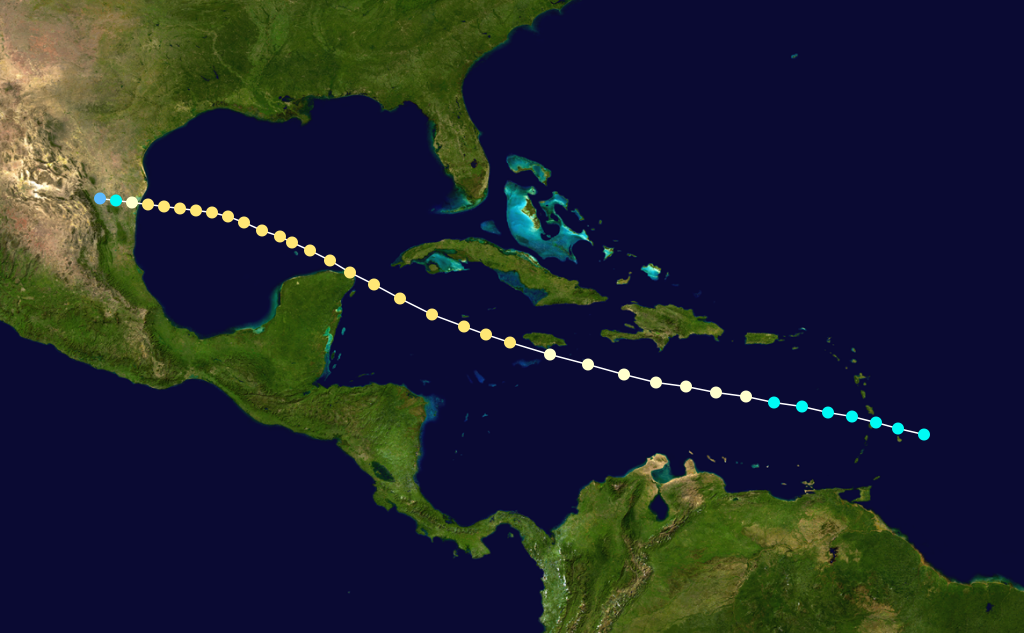
- Duration: August 22 – August 30
- Peak intensity: 110 mph (175 km/h) (1-min); 963 mbar (hPa)

Colegio de Belén meteorological observatory director Father Lorenzo Gangioti reported a tropical storm west of Dominica on August 22. Thus, the official track for this cyclone begins several hours earlier, when it was situated just east of Barbados. The storm moved west-northwestward into the Caribbean and strengthened into a hurricane by August 23. While passing near the south coast of Jamaica two days later, the system intensified into a Category 2 on the present-day Saffir–Simpson scale. The official track brings the storm ashore near the northeastern tip of the Yucatán Peninsula around 00:00 UTC on August 27, though the hurricane soon entered the Gulf of Mexico. Thereafter, the cyclone likely intensified further in the Gulf of Mexico and peaked with winds of 110 mph (175 km/h) and a minimum barometric pressure of 963 mbar (28.4 inHg), both estimated based on damage in Mexico. Early on August 30, the hurricane made landfall near Laguna Madre, Tamaulipas, and then quickly weakened, dissipating within several hours of moving inland. Chenoweth extended the track back a day earlier, initiating the track at tropical depression status on August 21. His study, published in 2014, also concludes that the storm reached major hurricane intensity on August 28 over the Gulf of Mexico.

Winds generated by the storm in western Cuba downed some poles in Pinar del Río Province. The hurricane reportedly washed away the town of Abasola and destroyed all homes in Rodriguez in northeastern Mexico. Damage to property reached into the millions of dollars. The Mexican National and the Monterey and Gulf railways reportedly suffered the heaviest losses, with several hundred yards of the former completely washout in some places and many destroyed rail bridges. The Mexican National Telegraph company lost approximately 5 mi (10 km) of wires and the government telegraph wires suffered similarly, leaving communications with Mexico only intact via Mexico City to Eagle Pass, Texas. Hurricane force-wind gusts were reported in Texas as far north as Corpus Christi, while tropical storm-force wind gusts reached Velasco. The former experienced a number of down trees and demolished homes. Additionally, Rockport reported its highest tide since 1883, while coastal flooding inundated several streets in Galveston.

=== Tropical Storm Three ===
- Tropical storm (SSHWS)
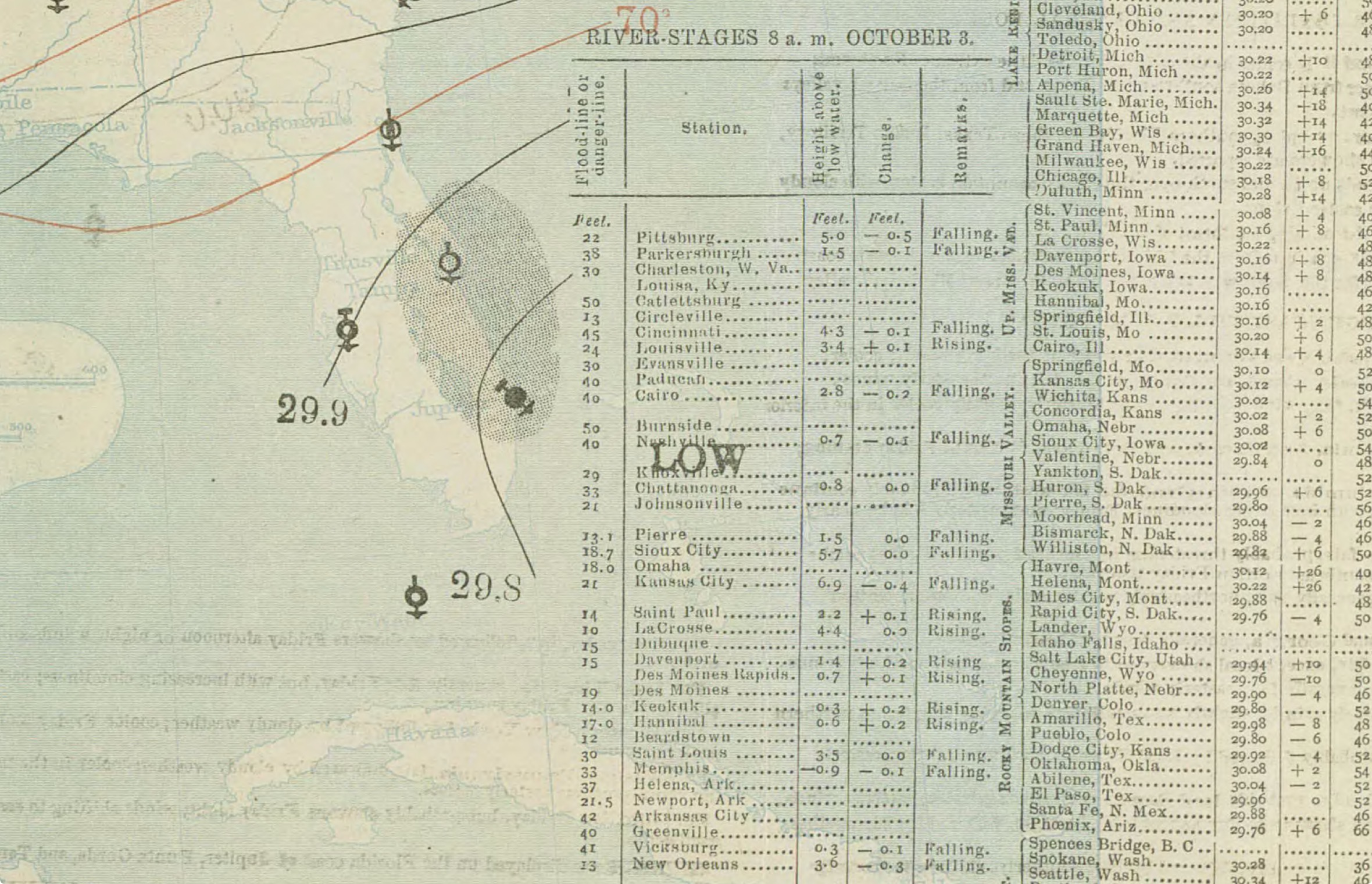
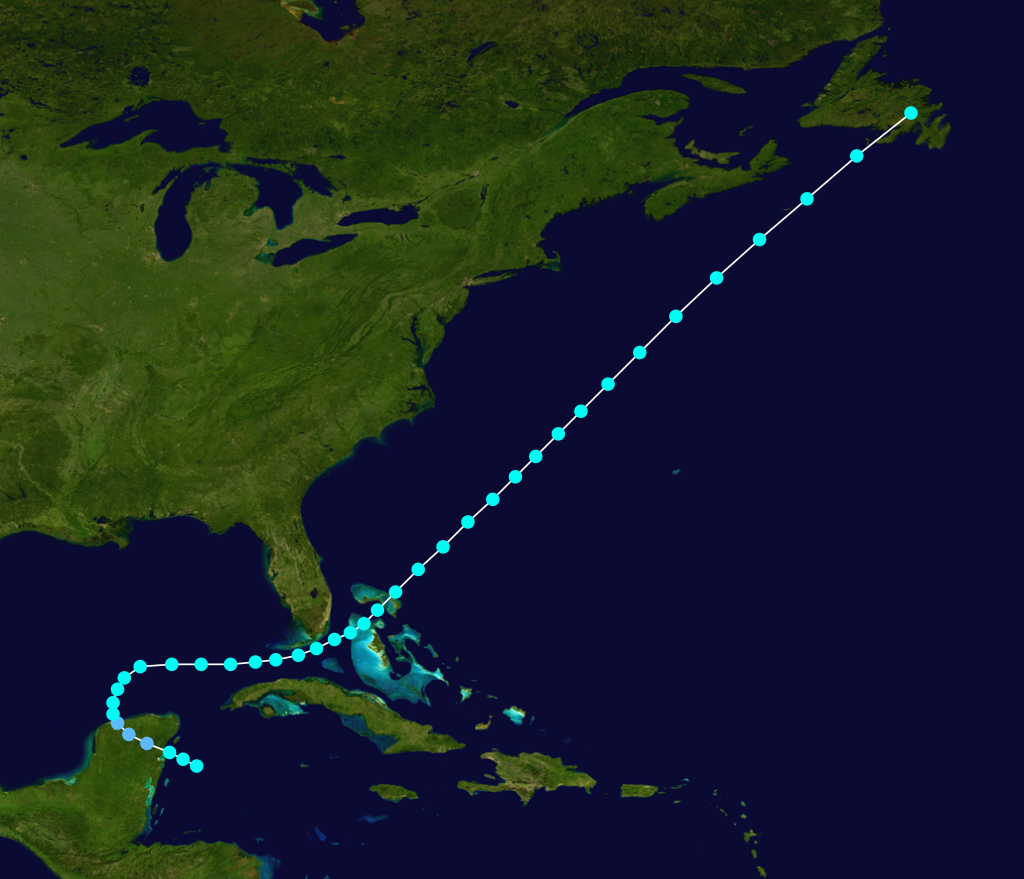
- Duration: September 28 – October 7
- Peak intensity: 60 mph (95 km/h) (1-min); ≤989 mbar (hPa)

Meteorologist Ivan Ray Tannehill began the track for this storm in the northwest Caribbean on September 28 during his 1938 review of the season, which subsequent meteorologists such as José Fernández Partagás and Henry F. Diaz confirmed in their 1995 reanalysis. The system moved west-northwestward and made landfall in the Yucatán Peninsula south of Tulum. Due to trekking across the peninsula for several hours, the cyclone likely weakened to a tropical depression, but re-intensified into a tropical storm upon emerging into the Gulf of Mexico on September 29. Thereafter, the storm peaked with winds of 60 mph (95 km/h) as it curved northeastward and then almost due eastward by the following day. However, upon reaching the Straits of Florida late on October 1, the cyclone assumed an east-northeastward to northeastward motion while passing just south of the Florida Keys. By October 3, the storm moved northeastward towards the western Bahamas, crossing the Abaco Islands before reaching the open Atlantic. The cyclone moved ashore Newfoundland near the Burin Peninsula on October 7 and was last noted shortly thereafter.

Heavy rains fell over western Cuba, causing floods that led to significant crop losses and the destruction of some dwellings in Pinar del Río and La Habana provinces. Additionally, a railroad company suffered about $300,000 in losses. This storm was responsible for an estimated 56 deaths in Cuba. General Martinez de Campos requested that the government provide aid to people residing in the Vuelta Abajo region. Although the cyclone moved just south of the Florida Keys, Key West only recorded sustained winds of 20 mph (32 km/h), while Titusville observed sustained winds of 40 mph (65 km/h). Heavy rains fell in Jupiter, where a downed wire cutoff communications with the telegraph station. The schooner Albertine lost its mast during the storm over the Grand Banks of Newfoundland on October 7.

The 2014 study by Chenoweth concluded that this storm formed over the southwestern Caribbean on September 25. Moving northwestward, the cyclone strikes Nicaragua and then curves north-northwestward before making landfall on the Yucatán Peninsula. Chenoweth then proposed a more southerly path, bringing the storm across Cuba rather than near the Florida Keys.

=== Tropical Storm Four ===
- Tropical storm (SSHWS)
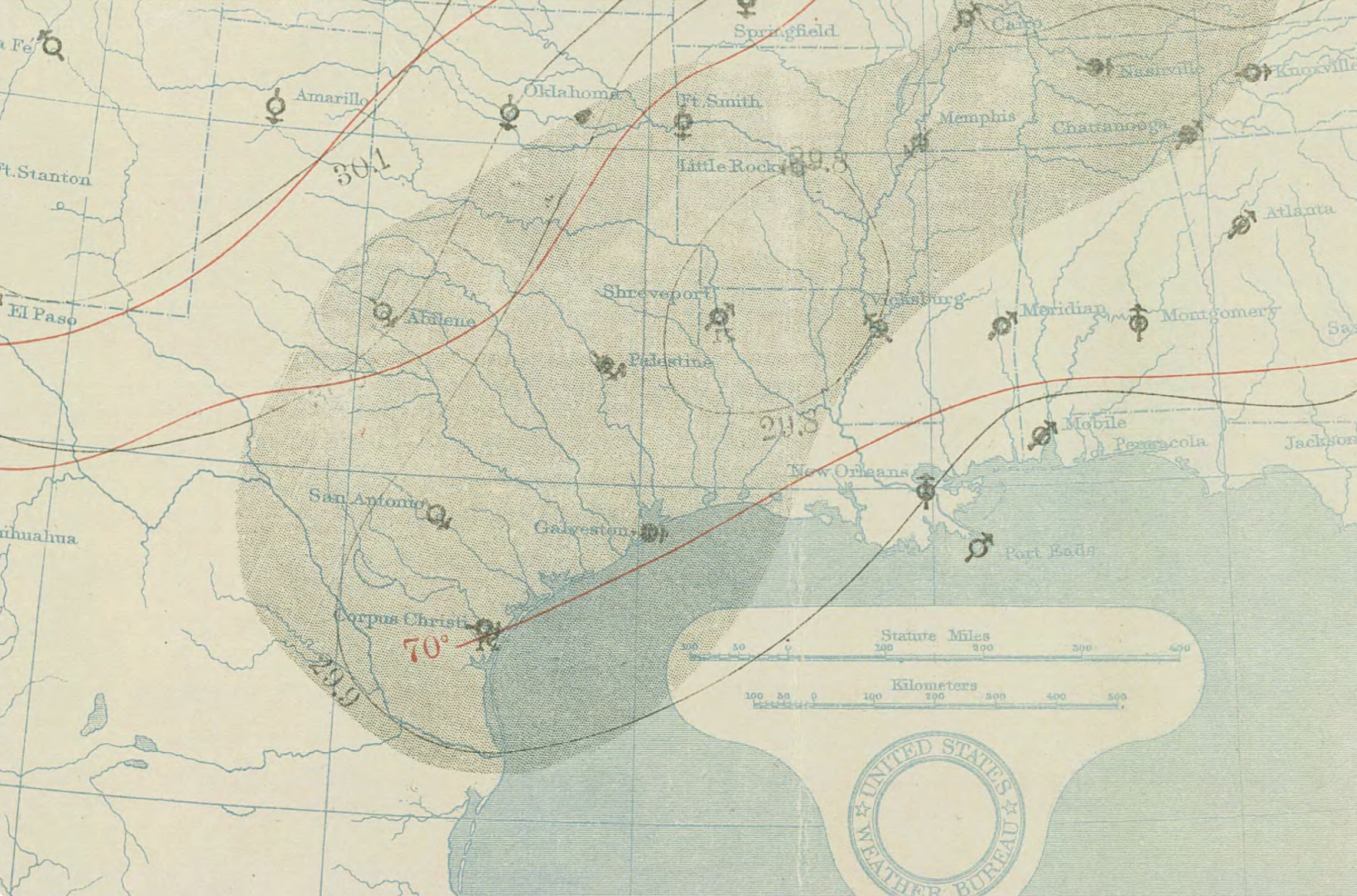
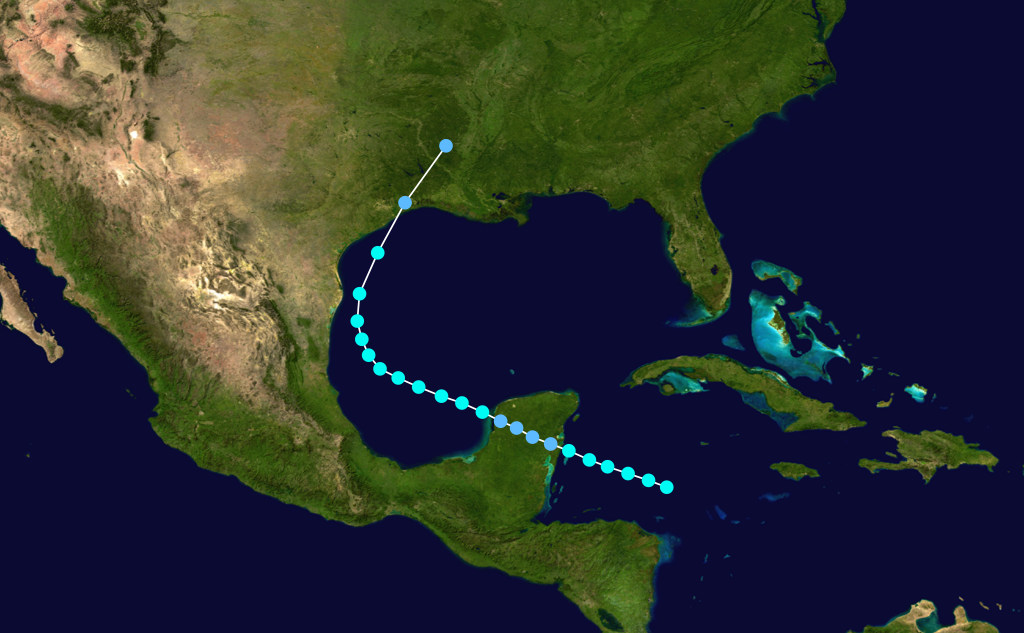
- Duration: October 2 – October 7
- Peak intensity: 40 mph (65 km/h) (1-min);

The track for this system begins over the northwestern Caribbean on October 2, despite Fernández Partagás and Diaz expressing skepticism about the cyclone's early stages due to the proximity of the previous storm. Moving west-northwestward, the storm struck the Yucatán Peninsula on October 4 and quickly weakened to a tropical depression. After emerging into the Gulf of Mexico early on October 5, the storm quickly re-strengthened into a tropical storm. By October 6, the cyclone turned northeastward, making landfall in Galveston, Texas, early the next day. After moving inland, the system rapidly weakened, dissipating over northern Louisiana on October 7. Due to no reports of gale-force winds, including Louisiana and Texas only recording sustained winds of 29–35 mph (47–56 km/h), the Atlantic hurricane reanalysis project concluded that the cyclone was, at most, a minimal tropical storm.

Chenoweth proposed the removal of this storm from HURDAT, finding "No evidence in land-based reports or from ships".

=== Hurricane Five ===
- Category 2 hurricane (SSHWS)
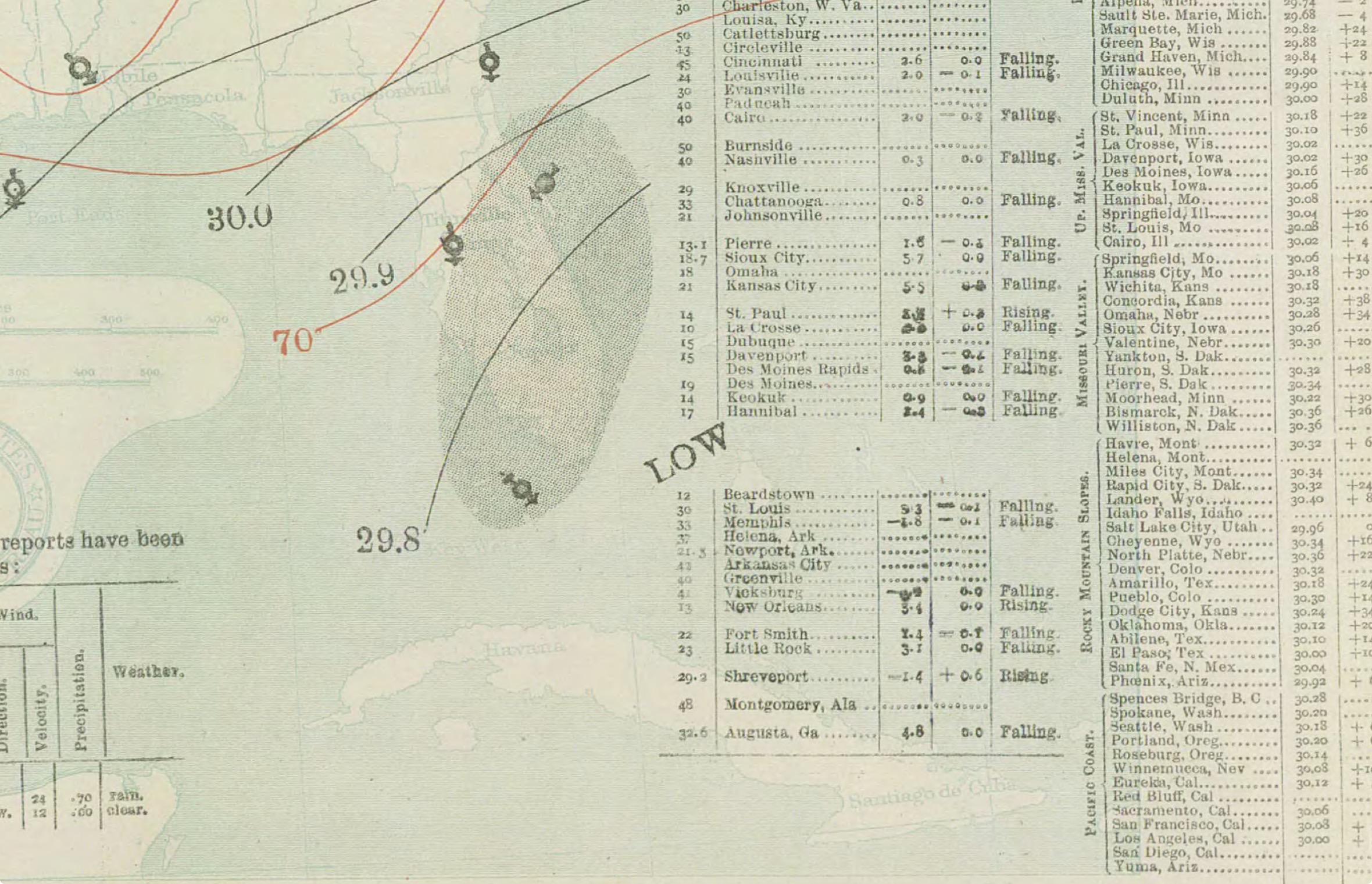
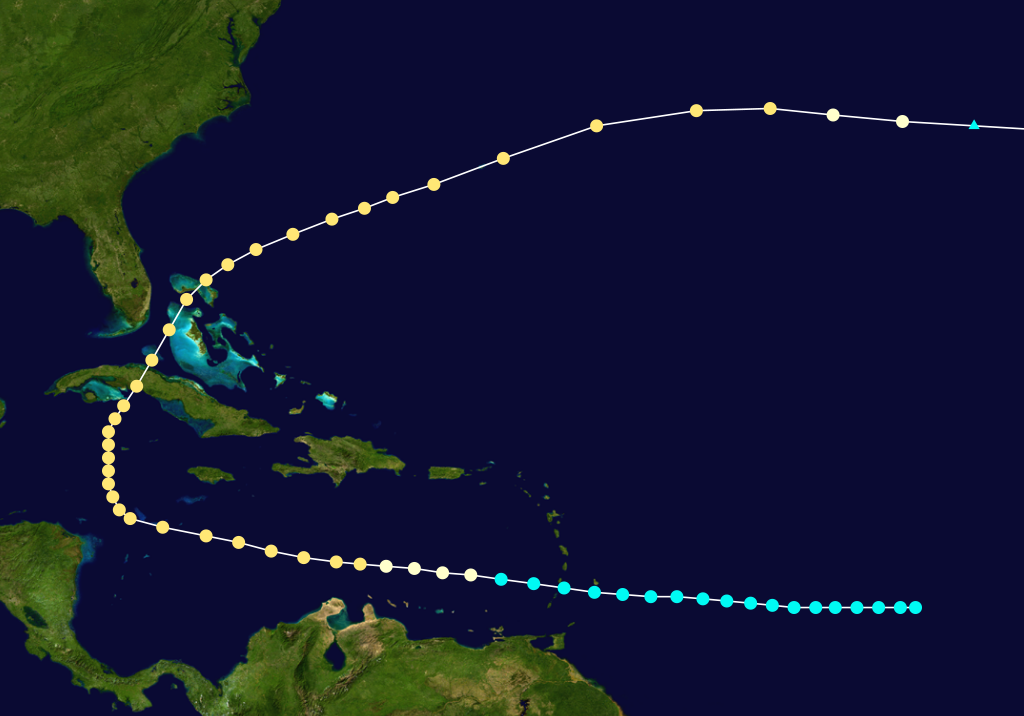
- Duration: October 12 – October 26
- Peak intensity: 105 mph (165 km/h) (1-min); ≤973 mbar (hPa)

The official track for this begins about 1,000 mi (1,610 km) east of Barbados on October 12. Moving westward to west-northwestward, the system passed through the Windward Islands three days later. After entering the Caribbean, the storm intensified into a hurricane on October 16 and to Category 2 hurricane about 24 hours later, peaking with winds of 105 mph (165 km/h). The hurricane turned northward on October 19, passing just west of the Cayman Islands on the next day. Thereafter, the cyclone curved north-northeastward and made landfall in Cuba near the city of Cienfuegos around 18:00 UTC on October 21. Quickly emerging into the southwestern Atlantic early the next day, the storm struck Grand Bahama island in the Bahamas shortly after 12:00 UTC. A more northeasterly motion then commenced and the hurricane crossed over or near Bermuda on October 24. The system likely began weakening significantly on the following day and transitioned into an extratropical cyclone about 700 mi (1,125 km) southwest of Flores Island in the Azores on October 26. The extratropical remnants dissipated several hours thereafter.

In Cuba, strong winds produced by the storm left significant impacts in Santa Clara Province. This included the destruction of buildings throughout the province, while many other structures lost their roof. Additionally, winds uprooted a number of large trees and downed sugar mill chimneys. Farther west, several towns reported severe flooding, such as in Aguacate, Ceiba del Agua, Güines, Madruga, Nueva Paz, and San Nicolás. Some lives were reportedly lost in Cuba. Parts of the east coast of Florida observed tropical storm-force wind gusts, reaching 55 mph (89 km/h) at both Jupiter and Key West. The storm washed away nearly all wharves from Juno to Lantana. Heavy rainfall left some washouts at nearby sections of the Florida East Coast Railway. In the Bahamas, the storm caused extensive damage on some islands. A correspondent to The Nassau Guardian described northern Bimini as "a wreck from one end to the other." Fewer than half a dozen homes on the island escaped damage, while approximately 2,000 coconut palm trees were uprooted. Strong winds on Bermuda toppled large trees across the island and snapped about 30 telephone poles in Devonshire Parish. Some homes were deroofed and several verandas collapsed.

A reanalysis study by Chenoweth, published in 2014, initiates the track for this storm over the southwest Caribbean on October 17. By October 20, the cyclone then follows a similar path to that in HURDAT, albeit slightly farther west, with a landfall on Cuba's Zapata Peninsula.

=== Tropical Storm Six ===
- Tropical storm (SSHWS)
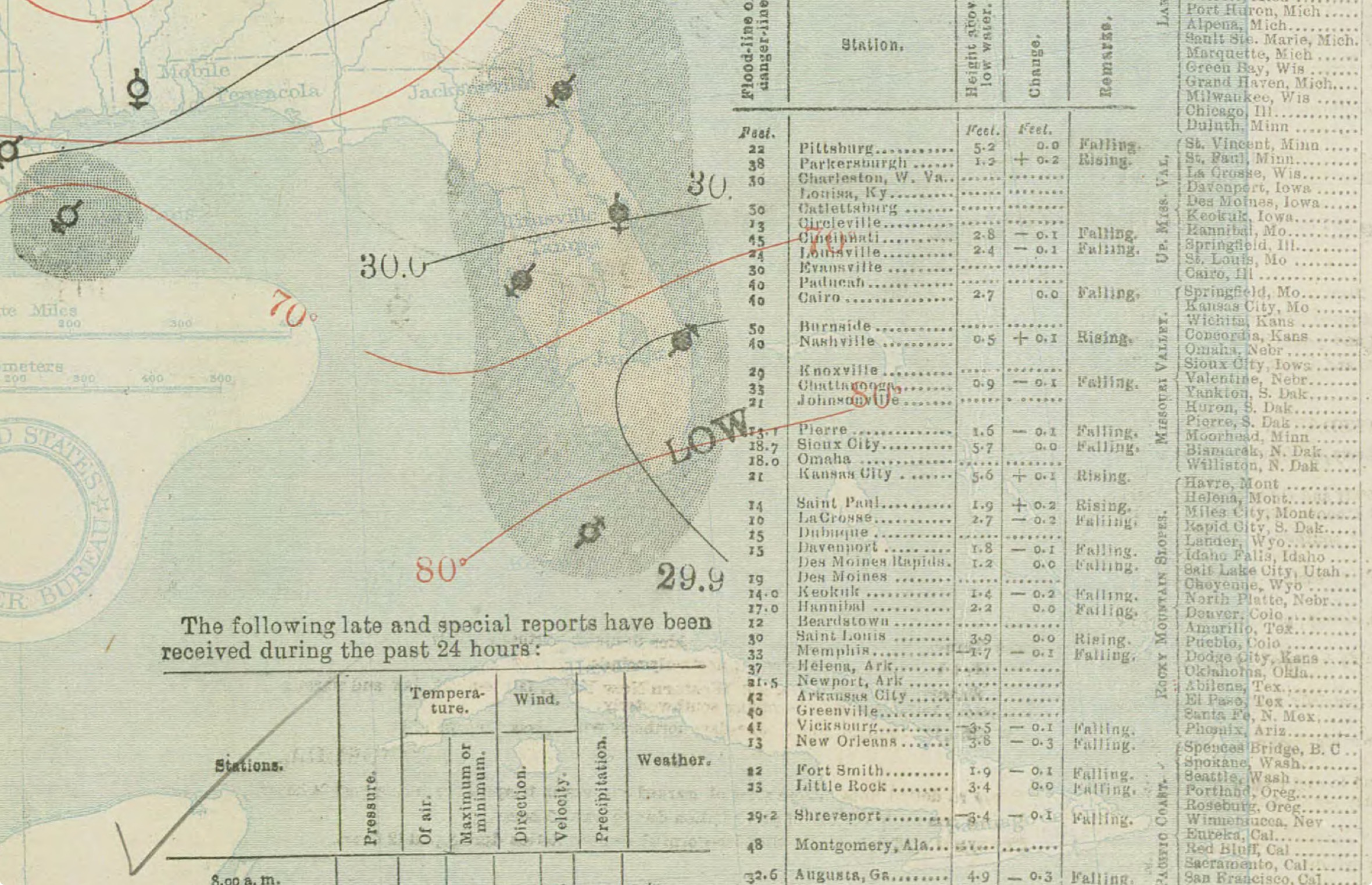
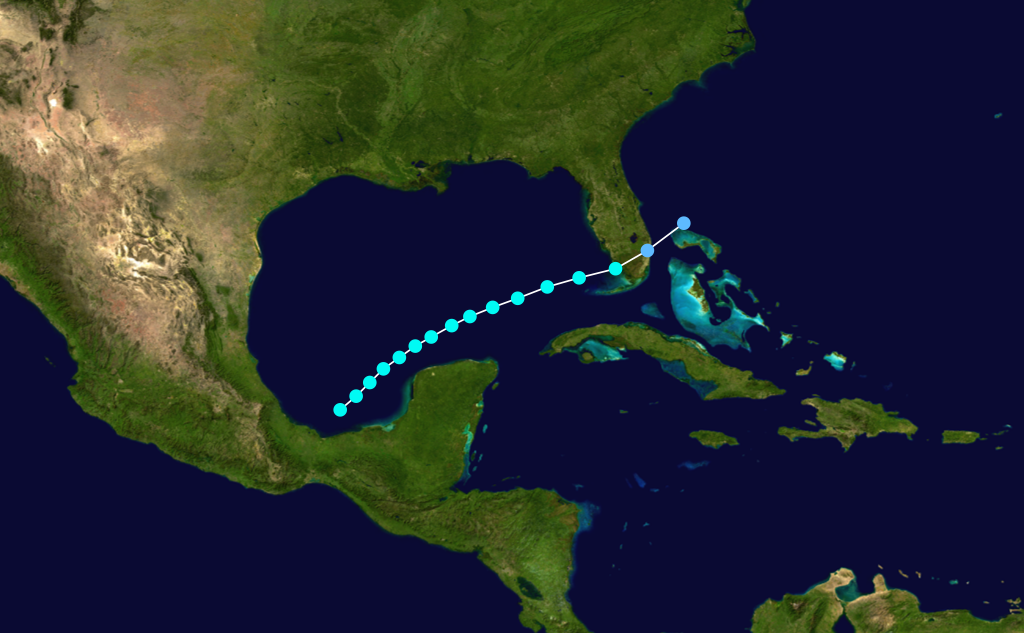
- Duration: October 13 – October 17
- Peak intensity: 40 mph (65 km/h) (1-min);

According to Weather Bureau meteorologist Charles L. Mitchell in 1924, this storm was first observed over the Bay of Campeche on October 13. Moving generally northwestward to west-northwestward across the Gulf of Mexico, the cyclone struck just south of Everglades City, Florida, on October 16. The storm quickly weakened to a tropical depression before it emerged into the Atlantic near present-day Delray Beach later that day. Early on October 17, the depression dissipated just north of Grand Bahama island in the Bahamas. Chenoweth argued for the removal of this system from HURDAT, finding "No evidence in land-based reports or from ships".

=== Other storms ===
While HURDAT currently recognizes six tropical cyclones for the 1895 season, Chenoweth proposed a total of ten systems in his reanalysis study, published in 2014. This included the removal of two systems and the addition of six storms others not listed in HURDAT. The first unofficial system began on June 8 as a subtropical storm offshore North Carolina. Early the next day, the subtropical system became fully tropical. On June 11, the cyclone made landfall in North Carolina and then dissipated the following day. Later in June, another storm also formed offshore the Carolinas on June 17. The storm moved generally northeastward to north-northeastward, aside from a jog to the southeast for a few days, before becoming extratropical by June 21.

On September 1, the next unofficial storm developed east of the Lesser Antilles. After moving northwestward and then northward, the cyclone turned northeastward by September 5 and transitioned into an extratropical system north of the Azores two days later. Another storm proposed by Chenoweth formed on September 11 and moved erratically to the north of the Azores before becoming extratropical after lasting for about a week. Later that month, a cyclone developed on September 28 near the Cabo Verde Islands. After initially moving west-northwestward, the storm turned west-southwestward before dissipating on October 1. Chenoweth's final proposed cyclone developed as a subtropical storm on November 3 northwest of the Cabo Verde Islands. Moving northwestward, the system became a tropical storm by the following day. The storm then turned northeastward on November 6, moving in that direction before transitioning into an extratropical cyclone on November 7.

== Season effects ==
This is a table of all of the known storms that have formed in the 1895 Atlantic hurricane season. It includes their duration, landfall, damages, and death totals. Deaths in parentheses are additional and indirect (an example of an indirect death would be a traffic accident), but were still related to that storm. Damage and deaths include totals while the storm was extratropical, a wave, or a low, and all of the damage figures are in 1895 USD.

Saffir–Simpson scale
TD	TS	C1	C2	C3	C4	C5

1895 North Atlantic tropical cyclone season statistics
Storm name	Dates active	Storm category at peak intensity	Max 1-min wind mph (km/h)	Min. press. (mbar)	Areas affected	Damage (US$)	Deaths	Ref(s).
One	August 14–17	Tropical storm	60 (95)	1009	Gulf Coast of the United States, Georgia	Unknown	None	
Two	August 22–30	Category 2 hurricane	110 (175)	963	Lesser Antilles, Cuba, Mexico, Texas	>$1 million	None	
Three	September 28 – October 7	Tropical storm	60 (95)	989	Mexico, Cuba, Florida, Bahamas	>$300,000	56	
Four	October 2–7	Tropical storm	40 (65)	Unknown	Mexico, Gulf Coast of the United States	Unknown	None	
Five	October 12–26	Category 2 hurricane	105 (165)	973	Cuba, Florida, Bahamas, Bermuda	Unknown	Unknown	
Six	October 13–17	Tropical storm	40 (65)	Unknown	Florida	Unknown	None	
Season aggregates
6 systems	August 2 – October 26		145 (230)	938		>$1.3 million	>56	

== See also ==
- Tropical cyclone observation
- List of Cayman Islands hurricanes
- List of Florida hurricanes (pre-1900)
- List of Texas hurricanes (pre-1900)
