= 1931 Pacific hurricane season =

Seasonal boundaries
- First system formed: July 3, 1931
- Last system dissipated: September 26, 1931

Strongest storm
- Name: Five
  - Lowest pressure: 976 mbar (hPa; 28.82 inHg)

Seasonal statistics
- Total storms: 9
- Total fatalities: >150
- Total damage: $500,000 (1931 USD)

Related articles
- 1931 Atlantic hurricane season; 1931 Pacific typhoon season; 1930s North Indian Ocean cyclone seasons

The 1931 Pacific hurricane season ran through the summer and fall of 1931. Before the satellite age started in the 1960s, data on east Pacific hurricanes was extremely unreliable. Most east Pacific storms were of no threat to land.

== Systems ==
=== Possible Tropical Cyclone One ===
On July 3, a tropical cyclone possibly existed south of Acapulco. A ship measured a pressure of 29.55 inHg (100.1 kPa).

=== Possible Tropical Cyclone Two ===
In the western part of the Gulf of Tehuantepec, a possible tropical cyclone existed on July 10. A ship reported a pressure of 29.66 inHg (100.4 kPa).

=== Tropical Cyclone Three ===
On July 21, a tropical cyclone began forming southwest of Manzanillo. It had completely formed by July 23. It moved along the coast, and entered the Gulf of California. It was last observed on July 25. This cyclone produced gales, and the lowest reported pressure was 29.39 inHg (99.5 kPa).

=== Tropical Cyclone Four ===
On July 26, a tropical cyclone existed midway between Acapulco and Salina Cruz. The lowest pressure reported by a ship was 29.63 inHg (100.3 kPa).

=== Tropical Cyclone Five ===
In the central Pacific east-southeast of the Hawaiian Islands, a ship encountered a tropical cyclone on August 30 and 31. It produced gales, and a pressure of 28.82 inHg (976 hPa).

=== Tropical Cyclone Six ===
South of the coast of Mexico, a tropical cyclone formed on September 6. It paralleled the coast, entered the Gulf of California, and dissipated by September 14. This system sank an American steamship called the Colombia (losses unknown). On land, the area around Santa Rosalía, Baja California Sur was severely devastated. More than 100 people were killed on land, mostly due to drowning. In Santa Rosalía itself, fifty were killed. Numerous small craft were sunk, with at least eight people going down with them. A merchant ship called Perkins was damaged in the storm, with two people washed overboard. On land, connections with the El Boleo copper mine were destroyed, with the mine itself flooded, causing $500,000 (1931 USD) in damage. Hundreds were left homeless. In the aftermath, there was a shortage of food and medicine, and troops were dispatched to maintain order.

=== Tropical Cyclone Seven ===
The next tropical cyclone was a slightly weaker and faster-moving clone of the previous one. On September 14, it formed at around the same location as the first, and took a similar path. It dissipated September 18 in the Gulf of California.

=== Tropical Cyclone Eight ===
A tropical cyclone existed from September 20 to on or just after September 24. It formed well south of the Mexican coast. It moved northwestward, and dissipated off the coast of the Baja California Peninsula.

=== Tropical Cyclone Nine ===
On September 26, a tropical cyclone formed south of the Mexican coast. It moved generally northwards, and dissipated in the Gulf of California sometime after September 29.

== See also ==
- 1931 Atlantic hurricane season
- 1931 Pacific typhoon season
- 1930s North Indian Ocean cyclone seasons
- 1900–1940 South Pacific cyclone seasons
- 1900–1950 South-West Indian Ocean cyclone seasons
- 1930s Australian region cyclone seasons
