= Hurricane Tico =

Category 4 Pacific hurricane in 1983

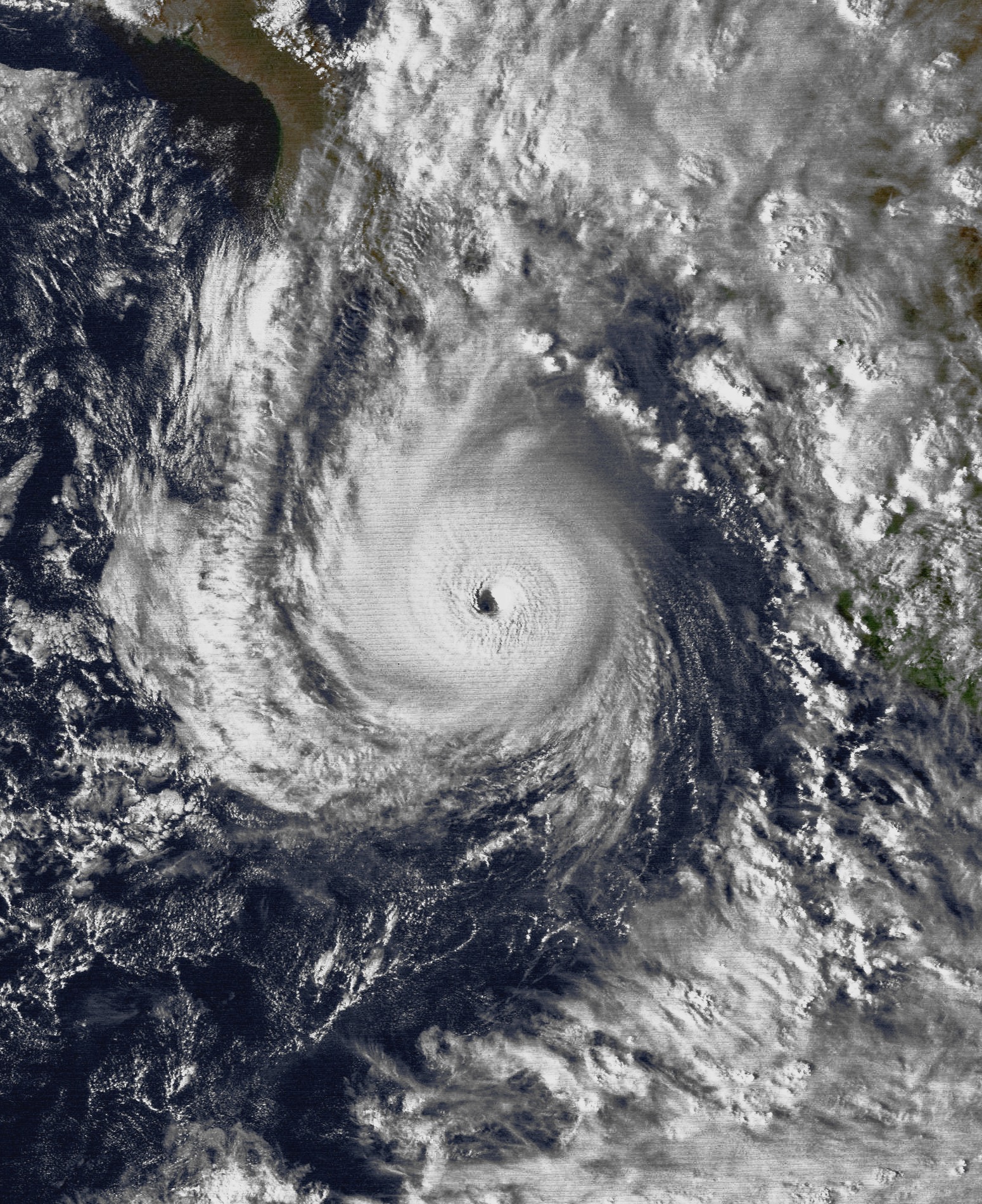
- Tico at maximum sustained winds south of the Baja Peninsula on October 16

Meteorological history
- Formed: October 11, 1983
- Dissipated: October 24, 1983

Category 4 major hurricane
- 1-minute sustained (SSHWS/NWS)
- Highest winds: 130 mph (215 km/h)

Overall effects
- Fatalities: 141
- Damage: $284 million (1983 USD)
- Areas affected: Mexico; South Central United States; Eastern United States
- IBTrACS
- Part of the 1983 Pacific hurricane season

Hurricane Tico was a deadly and destructive tropical cyclone that brought significant damage in Mexico and the United States in October 1983. Tico was the twenty-third tropical cyclone, nineteenth named storm, eleventh hurricane, and eighth major hurricane of the 1983 Pacific hurricane season. The hurricane originated from a weak tropical disturbance that crossed Costa Rica into the Pacific Ocean on October 7, 1983. Over warm waters, the system was sufficiently organized to be declared Tropical Depression Twenty-One on October 11, about 575 mi (925 km) south of Acapulco. On October 12 it turned sharply northward; the depression was upgraded to Tropical Storm Tico on October 13. Tropical Storm Tico continued to intensify. Two days after becoming a tropical storm, Tico strengthened further to attain hurricane status. Early on October 19, it reached peak winds of 130 mph (210 km/h). It weakened slightly as it approached the coast, and at about 1500 UTC that day Tico made landfall near Mazatlán with winds of 125 mph (205 km/h). The remains were tracked into the Mid-Atlantic States for five more days.

Tico was the deadliest and most destructive tropical cyclone of the season. Overall, the hurricane sank nine small ships, and nine fishermen were killed. Hurricane Tico was responsible severe flooding and heavy damage due to strong winds. Throughout the state of Sinaloa, the hurricane destroyed nearly 19,000 acres (77 km^{2}) of bean and corn, although most of the agricultural damage occurred south of Mazatlán. In addition, the hurricane disrupted the flow of drinking water. A total of 13 hotels received extensive damage and 14 people were hurt. Twenty-five thousand people were homeless and damage throughout the country was estimated at $200 million (1983 USD). Hurricane Tico caused a total of 135 deaths in Mexico. Although most of its impact occurred in Mexico, Tico's remnants moved into the United States, where they caused heavy rains and flooding. A total of 141 people were killed and the damage amounted to $284 million (1983 USD).

== Meteorological history ==
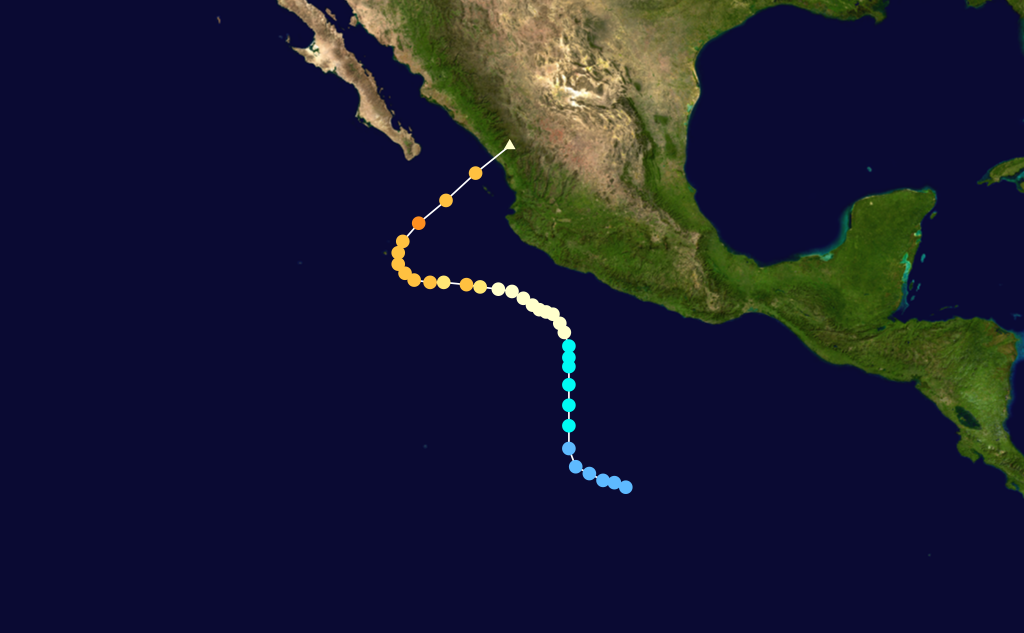
Map plotting the storm's track and intensity, according to the Saffir–Simpson scale Map key Saffir–Simpson scale Tropical depression (≤38 mph, ≤62 km/h) Tropical storm (39–73 mph, 63–118 km/h) Category 1 (74–95 mph, 119–153 km/h) Category 2 (96–110 mph, 154–177 km/h) Category 3 (111–129 mph, 178–208 km/h) Category 4 (130–156 mph, 209–251 km/h) Category 5 (≥157 mph, ≥252 km/h) Unknown Storm type Tropical cyclone Subtropical cyclone Extratropical cyclone, remnant low, tropical disturbance, or monsoon depression

The origins of Hurricane Tico were from a weak tropical disturbance that crossed Costa Rica into the Pacific Ocean on October 7. It tracked westward through an area of progressively warmer water temperatures, and by October 11 the system was sufficiently organized to be declared Tropical Depression Twenty-One, about 575 mi (930 km) south of the Mexican port of Acapulco. The depression initially maintained a west-northwest motion, although on October 12 it turned sharply northward, due to the influence of a strong trough moving eastward through Mexico. Gradually organizing, the depression was upgraded to Tropical Storm Tico on October 13 by the Eastern Pacific Hurricane Center (EPHC).

Tropical Storm Tico continued to intensify as it progressed toward the southwest Mexican coastline. A Hurricane Hunters flight late on October 13 indicated the beginnings of an eyewall, 14 miles (22 km) in diameter, although the eye was open and incomplete. The next day, Tico strengthened further to attain hurricane status, about 190 mi (310 km) off the Guerrero coast. Around that time, a building ridge to the north of Tico turned the hurricane northwestward away from land. The intensity fluctuated by about 20 mph (35 km/h) for two days, during which it curved more to the west. By October 16, its strengthening rate quickened, and Tico reached major hurricane status (Category 3 or higher on the Saffir-Simpson hurricane wind scale).

After briefly weakening into a Category 2 hurricane, Hurricane Tico again attained major hurricane strength. Meanwhile, another trough moved eastward across northwestern Mexico; as a result, the hurricane turned northwestward and began accelerating while maintaining a well-defined eye. Early on October 19, it reached peak winds of 135 mph (215 km/h), equivalent to a powerful Category 4 hurricane on the Saffir–Simpson hurricane wind scale (SSHWS), while located about 200 mi (320 km) south-southeast of the southern tip of the Baja California Peninsula. It weakened slightly as it approached the coast, and at about 1500 UTC that day Tico made landfall very near Mazatlán with winds of 125 mph (205 km/h). It rapidly weakened over land and merged with a cold front, although significant moisture from the hurricane persisted into the South Central United States. After dropping heavy rainfall in Oklahoma, the former low associated with Tico continued northeastward to near Lake Michigan. Precipitation spread across the Ohio Valley and Mid-Atlantic States as the low turned southeastward, and the remnants of Tico were last observed on October 24 over Ohio.

== Preparations, impact, and aftermath ==
=== Mexico ===
Although hurricane warnings were issued for portions of the country, many shrimp boat crew members ignored these warnings. As the tropical cyclone passed south of the Baja California Peninsula, it dropped light rainfall of around 1 inch (25 mm) in the area. Moderate rainfall was reported around the landfall location, peaking at 8.98 inches (228 mm) in Pueblo Nuevo, Durango; lighter precipitation of 1–3 inches (25–75 mm) occurred further inland toward the Mexico/United States border.

Two 328 ft (100 m) anchored ships were washed aground by strong waves and swells, with a total of seven ships reported missing. Overall, the hurricane sank nine small ships, and nine fishermen were killed.

In Mazatlán and 22 other nearby towns, power service was cut off but was restored the next day. The surge and strong winds of Hurricane Tico were responsible for severe flooding and heavy damage. Throughout the state of Sinaloa, the hurricane destroyed nearly 19,000 acres (77 km^{2}) of bean and corn, although most of the agricultural damage occurred south of Mazatlán. Many roofs of homes received damage. In addition, the hurricane disrupted the flow of drinking water. A total of 13 hotels received extensive damage and 14 people were hurt. Throughout Durango, many bridges collapsed due to flooding. Twenty-five thousand people were homeless and damage throughout the country was estimated at $200 million (1983 USD). However, the death toll was initially uncertain. Local reports from a few days after the storm indicated 105 people were missing. According to a report from the United States Agency for International Development indicated that Hurricane Tico caused a total of 135 deaths in Mexico.

Due to destruction from Hurricane Tico, President Miguel De La Madrid declared a state of emergency and also ordered the department of health, defense, and Interior to rush to provide assistance to the devastated state.

=== United States ===
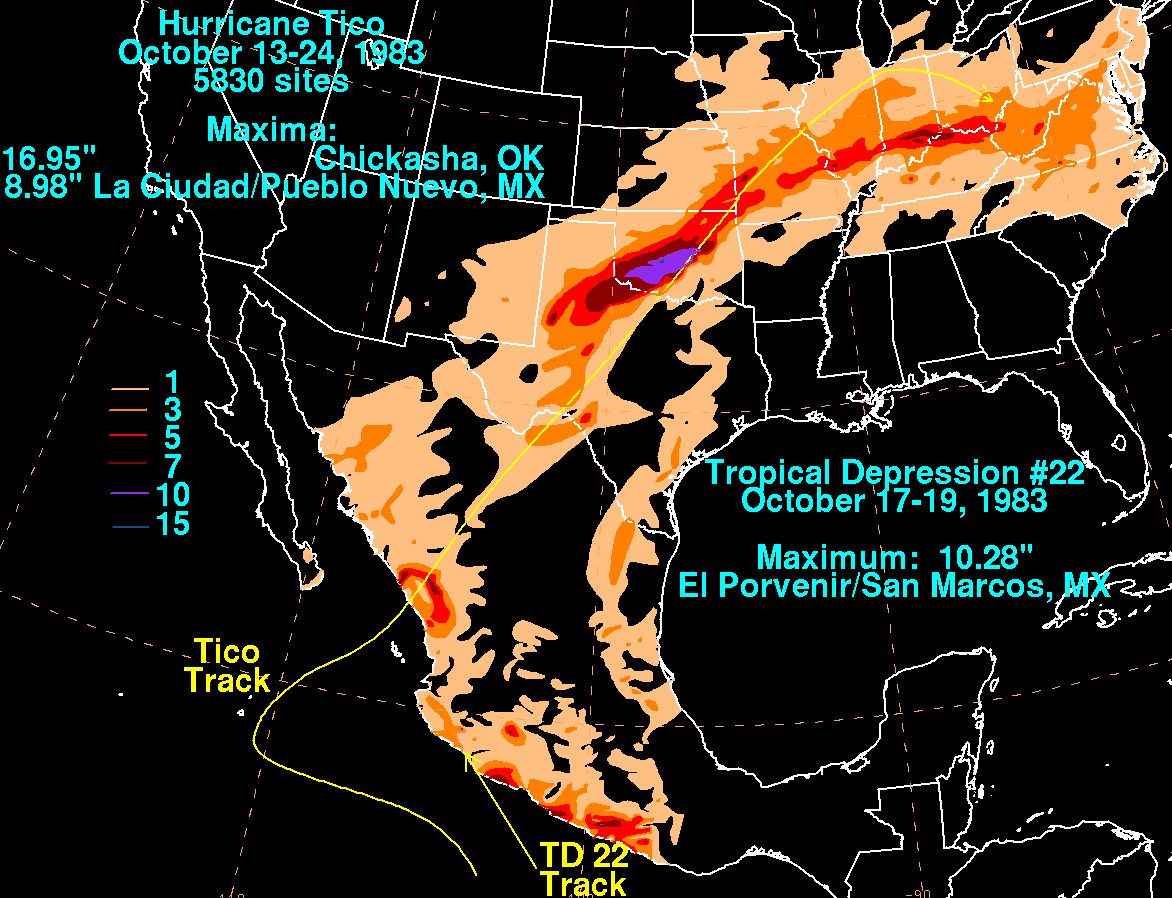
Map of rainfall related to Tico in the United States

Flash flood watches and warnings were posted from Texas to Missouri. Rain from Tico continued into the South-Central United States and increased after merging with the cold front. Rainfall totals of 5 in (130 mm) to 7 in (180 mm) extended from the Texas Panhandle through Missouri, and the greatest rainfall maxima was 16.95 inches (431 mm) in Chickasha, Oklahoma. Precipitation from Tico continued northeastward and eastward, with rainfall totals of 3–7 inches (75–175 mm) extending across the Ohio Valley and into the Mid-Atlantic.

Flooding was reported in parts of southern Kansas, Texas, and especially Oklahoma, with serious flooding reported along the lower Washita River. The Oklahoma Highway Patrol asked for volunteers with motorboats 16 ft (4.9 m) or longer to help rescue 50-100 trapped people. The patrol also asked the Oklahoma City police to help find victims in the floodwaters, but plans for this were held off late on October 20 due to poor weather conditions. Across Guthrie, 500 people, or 5% of the town's population, had sought three emergency shelters. According to officials, more evacuations to shelters were anticipated. Authorities planned to evacuate an additional 1,500 families. Throughout the town, water was 7 ft (2.1 m) deep and was moving at speeds between 20 mph (32 km/h) and 30 mph (48 km/h). The Cottonwood Creek, also near Guthrie, reached flood stage. The nearby Cimarron river was rising 2 ft (0.61 m) an hour. In Lexington, Oklahoma guardsmen were called out to help police. Across Lubbock, Texas, sewer pipes were backed up due to 7 in (180 mm) inches of rain. Throughout Oklahoma and Texas, 200 people were homeless and six people were killed and one person was missing. According to Kansas officials, one person was killed in the state. In the aftermath of the storm, residents cleaned up debris on streets. By October 23, people living in Guthrie were given permission to return to their homes because floodwaters started to recede. A total of $77 million in crop damage occurred in Oklahoma. Total damage in the state was estimated at $84 million (1983 USD, $182 million 2009 USD).

== See also ==
- List of Mexico hurricanes
- List of Category 4 Pacific hurricanes
