= Hurricane Manuel =

Category 1 Pacific hurricane in 2013

- Manuel making landfall in Mexico at peak intensity early on September 18

Meteorological history
- Formed: September 13, 2013
- Remnant low: September 19, 2013
- Dissipated: September 20, 2013

Category 1 hurricane
- 1-minute sustained (SSHWS/NWS)
- Highest winds: 75 mph (120 km/h)
- Lowest pressure: 983 mbar (hPa); 29.03 inHg

Overall effects
- Fatalities: 169 total
- Damage: $4.2 billion (2013 USD) (Second-costliest Pacific hurricane on record)
- Areas affected: Oaxaca, Guerrero, Michoacán, Colima, Jalisco, Sinaloa, Texas
- IBTrACS
- Part of the 2013 Pacific hurricane season

Hurricane Manuel (/ˌmæn(j)uˈɛl, ˌmɑːn-/) was a catastrophic tropical cyclone that brought widespread flooding across much of Mexico in September 2013, in conjunction with Hurricane Ingrid. The fifteenth named storm and seventh hurricane of the annual hurricane season, Manuel originated from a strong area of low pressure south of Acapulco on September 13. Within favorable conditions aloft, the storm intensified into a tropical storm as it tracked northward. The following day, Manuel curved westward and strengthened to a point just shy of hurricane intensity before making its first landfall at that intensity on September 15. Due to interaction with land, the tropical storm quickly weakened, and its center dissipated over western Mexico on September 16. However, the storm's remnants continued to track northwestward into the Gulf of California, where they reorganized into a tropical cyclone the next day. Manuel regained tropical storm status on September 18 as it began to curve northeastward. Shortly thereafter, Manuel attained Category 1 hurricane intensity, before making its final landfall just west of Culiacán at peak intensity. Over land, Manuel quickly weakened due to interaction with Mexico's high terrain, and the storm dissipated early on September 20.

Due to the impending threat of Manuel, several Mexican municipalities were put under disaster alerts. Upon making its first landfall, Manuel caused extreme flooding in southern Mexico. Property and agricultural damage as a result of the system was widespread, and roughly one million people were estimated to have been directly affected. In Guerrero, 97 people perished, including 18 in Acapulco. Seventy-one others died due to a mudslide in La Pintada. In Guerrero alone, around 30,000 homes were damaged and 46 rivers overflowed their banks. There, 20,000 persons were evacuated to shelters. Statewide, repairs to damage from the storm totaled MXN$3 billion ($230 million USD). (Note: All currencies are converted to United States Dollars using Google.) Other impacts from Manuel spread as far east as the Isthmus of Tehuantepec, where 300 families were displaced. In the region, at least 11,591 homes were destroyed by the floods. Meanwhile, the nation sustained additional impacts from Atlantic Hurricane Ingrid.

After its second landfall, additional floods occurred in several towns, and in Sinaloa over 100,000 people were rendered homeless and four people died. As a result of Manuel's impacts, 107 municipalities were declared disaster regions. Damage in Sinaloa totaled MXN$500 million (US$37.9 million). The Mexican Army was dispatched in several locations to aid in post-tropical cyclone relief operations. Following the storm, looting in heavily impacted areas became commonplace, and as such government forces were also dispatched to prevent further looting. Overall, 169 people lost their lives in Mexico, while damage exceeded MXN$55 billion (US$4.2 billion). Manuel was the costliest Pacific hurricane on record at the time, until it was surpassed by Hurricane Otis in 2023.

== Meteorological history ==
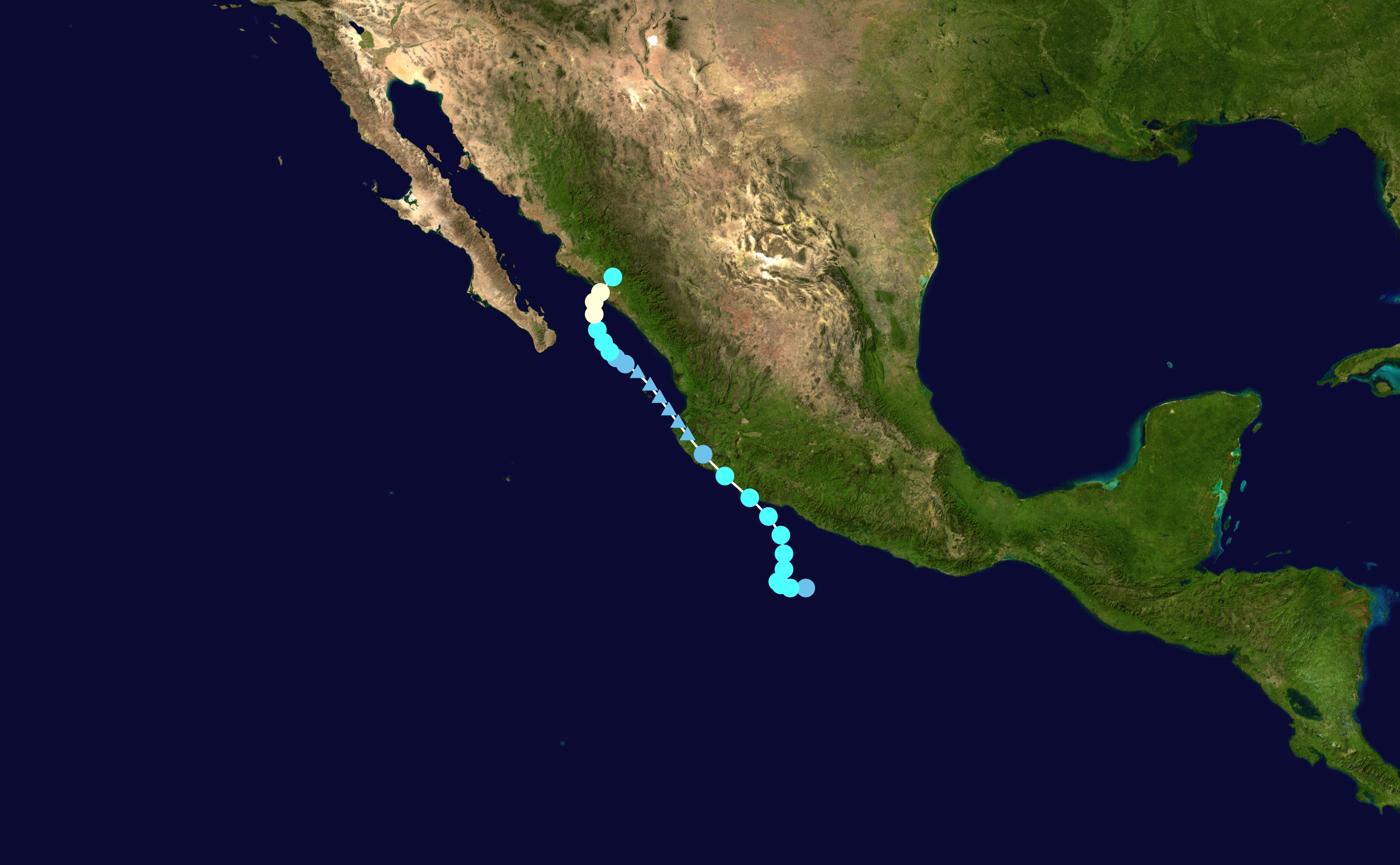
Map plotting the storm's track and intensity, according to the Saffir–Simpson scale Map key Saffir–Simpson scale Tropical depression (≤38 mph, ≤62 km/h) Tropical storm (39–73 mph, 63–118 km/h) Category 1 (74–95 mph, 119–153 km/h) Category 2 (96–110 mph, 154–177 km/h) Category 3 (111–129 mph, 178–208 km/h) Category 4 (130–156 mph, 209–251 km/h) Category 5 (≥157 mph, ≥252 km/h) Unknown Storm type Tropical cyclone Subtropical cyclone Extratropical cyclone, remnant low, tropical disturbance, or monsoon depression

The origins of Manuel can be traced back to a tropical wave that left the African continent in late August. The wave entered the Caribbean Sea on September 5, although the northern portion of the wave axis later developed into Hurricane Ingrid. On September 10, the National Hurricane Center (NHC) remarked the potential for a low-pressure area to develop off the southwest coast of Mexico during the subsequent few days, provided the system remained offshore. The next day, a low formed while it was nearly stationary, accompanied by scattered convection. Strong wind shear and proximity to land were expected to limit development, although conditions became more favorable on September 12. On that day, the convection became better organized. At 1200 UTC on September 13, the NHC initiated advisories on Tropical Depression Thirteen-E, noting that the system had enough of a well-defined circulation and convection. By that time, wind shear had diminished and warm waters were expected to allow intensification, and the main inhibiting factors for development were proximity to land and association with the Intertropical Convergence Zone.

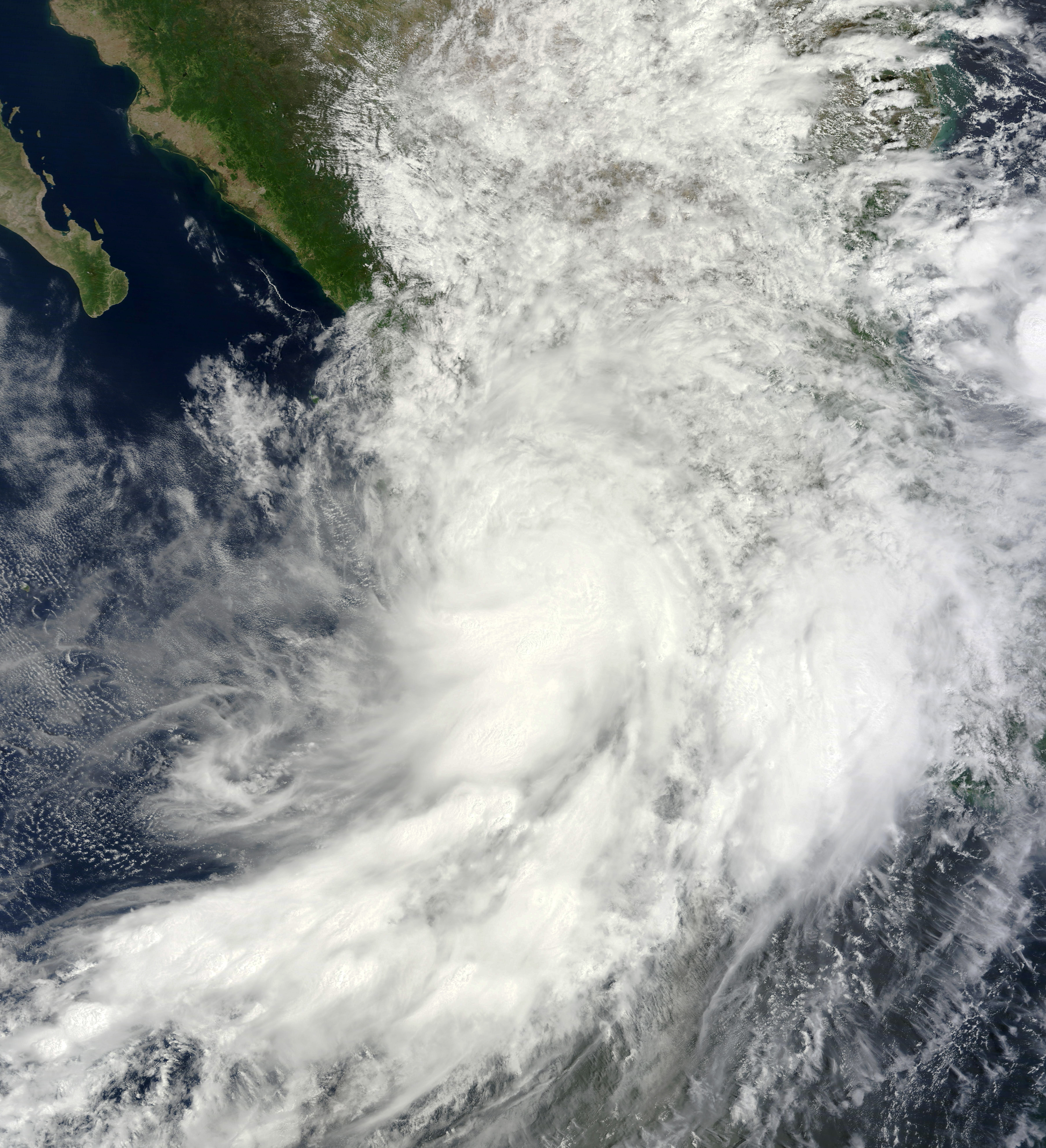
Tropical Storm Manuel over Western Mexico on September 15

Within a few hours of developing, the depression quickly intensified into Tropical Storm Manuel. By early on September 14, an eye feature developed as rainbands increased. However, Manuel was embedded within a broad weather system that extended from the eastern Pacific across Mexico, which included Hurricane Ingrid in the Bay of Campeche on the Gulf of Mexico coast. The broad system, including Manuel, moved generally northward. By early on September 15, Manuel had developed a central dense overcast, with a 17 mi (27 km) wide eye in the center. Based on the structure and satellite-intensity estimates, the NHC estimated Manuel attained secondary peak winds of 70 mph (115 km/h), just shy of hurricane status. The agency noted the potential for further strengthening into a hurricane, citing the warm waters, moist environment, and low shear. A break in the subtropical ridge to the north allowed the storm to initially continue generally to the north-northeast, soon peaking as a low-end Category 1 hurricane; however, after reaching its peak intensity, Manuel turned back to the northwest while accelerating. On September 15, Manuel made landfall near Aquila in Michoacán as a high-end tropical storm, though operationally, it was believed to have moved ashore near Manzanillo in Colima. Early on September 16, the storm weakened into a tropical depression after the circulation became disrupted, although it continued dropping heavy rainfall. Later that day, the surface center dissipated over western Mexico.

The remnants of Manuel tracked northwest around a ridge situated over the southeastern United States, and late on September 16, emerged over open waters. Despite only marginally favorable conditions, convection soon increased over the center. At 1800 UTC on September 17 Manuel regenerated into a tropical depression after redeveloping a well-defined circulation. Furthermore, conditions favored additional strengthening as the system tracked slowly northwestward around a ridge, although the cyclone was expected to move onshore the Baja California Peninsula in a few days. Although the convection was initially ragged, Manuel re-intensified into a tropical storm on September 18. Later that day, an eye developed in the center of the increasingly organizing convection, and at 0000 UTC on September 19, Manuel became a hurricane. It thus became the first eastern North Pacific tropical cyclone since records began in 1949 to make landfall in mainland Mexico, and later redevelop into a hurricane. The storm shifted more to the north, resulting in land interaction earlier than anticipated. Around 1200 UTC on September 19, Manuel made landfall just west of Culiacán as a minimal hurricane. Moving over the high terrain of western Mexico, Manuel quickly weakened into a tropical storm. The storm's circulation dissipated at 0000 UTC on September 20, over the Sierra Madre Occidental mountain range.

== Preparations ==
On the afternoon of September 13, a tropical storm warning was issued from Acapulco to Lázaro Cárdenas, Michoacán. Thirty-six hours later, a hurricane warning was issued from Lázaro Cárdenas to Manzanillo as the system was expected to become a hurricane prior to landfall. Later on September 15, a tropical storm watch was declared north of the hurricane warning. By early the next day, all watches and warnings were no longer in effect. In addition to the aforementioned watches and warnings, an "orange" alert was issued in southern Michoacán, and "yellow" (moderate) alert was in place for the rest of Michoacán and Guerrero. Lower levels of alerts were issued in Nayarit, Colima, Jalisco, Oaxaca, and in the southern portion of Sinaloa. Twenty-five families were evacuated in Lázaro Cárdenas, and Arteaga, Michoacán. On September 17, all classes were suspended in Colima.

After regenerating into a tropical cyclone in the Gulf of California, a tropical storm watch was issued just north of Mazatlán as well as the southwestern portion of the Baja California Peninsula The next day, a hurricane watch was issued for the area south of Topolobampo. At 2100 UTC on September 18, the hurricane watch was upgraded into a hurricane warning. Meanwhile, a tropical storm warning was designated south of the hurricane warning area to Mazatlán. On the evening of September 19, all watches and warnings were discontinued, as Manuel had moved inland.

On September 18, when the cyclone first threatened the state, 13 municipalities were placed on alert in Sonora. Along the Baja California Peninsula, seven ports were closed. The ports of Mazatlán, Cabo San Lucas, and San José del Cabo were closed for small craft and night interests. A "yellow" alert was issued for southern Baja California Sur while a "green" alert was issued for the northern portion of the state. In Sinaloa, classes were suspended. Prior to landfall, 700 people were evacuated statewide, including 365 residents from two municipalities. Over 60 families were evacuated in Navolato. An "orange" alert was also activated for the state.

== Impact ==
Costliest Pacific hurricanes
Rank	Cyclone	Season	Damage	Ref
1	5 Otis	2023	$12–16 billion	
2	1 Manuel	2013	$4.2 billion	
3	4 Iniki	1992	$3.1 billion	
4	3 John	2024	$2.45 billion	
5	4 Odile	2014	$1.82 billion	
6	TS Agatha	2010	$1.1 billion	
7	4 Hilary	2023	$948 million	
8	5 Willa	2018	$825 million	
9	1 Madeline	1998	$750 million	
10	2 Rosa	1994	$700 million	

Around the same time as Manuel's first landfall, Hurricane Ingrid made landfall along the eastern coast of the nation; this marked the first time two tropical cyclones struck the nation within 24 hours since 1958. Overall, economic impact exceeded MXN$55 billion (US$4.2 billion). Damage to roads alone totaled to $2 billion pesos ($153 million 2013 USD). A total of 123 people were killed due to Hurricane Manuel, at least of 104 of which were direct. Roughly 59,000 people were evacuated, including 39,000 that sought shelter. Approximately 1 million people were directly affected by Manuel.

Hurricane Manuel brought extremely heavy rains for eight days over much of Mexico, especially over mountainous terrain, although this precipitation was aided by Ingrid as well as large-scale southwesterly monsoonal flow. Numerous locations recorded more than 10 in (250 mm) of rain. A peak storm total of 43.6 in (1,110 mm) was measured in San Isidro, Guerrero. In nearby Acapulco, a secondary maximum of 17.8 in (450 mm) was recorded. Further north, in Michoacán, a statewide peak rainfall total of 22.11 in (562 mm) occurred. After making its second landfall, 18.52 in (470 mm) of precipitation fell in Culiacán and 15.32 in (389 mm) was observed in nearby Sanalona.

=== Oaxaca ===
In Jicayan, Manuel damaged 10 homes and flooded a school. Offshore, one boat was reportedly missing. Along the Isthmus of Tehuantepec, 300 families were displaced from their homes. Roughly 5,000 animals were killed by the storm. A total of 200 ha (490 acres) of crop was destroyed in Oaxaca; however, damage in the state was considerably less than in Guerrero. Within Oaxaca, 19 communities were isolated. Four people were killed in the state. Overall, 77 municipalities or 10,000 people were directly affected by the floods.

=== Guerrero ===
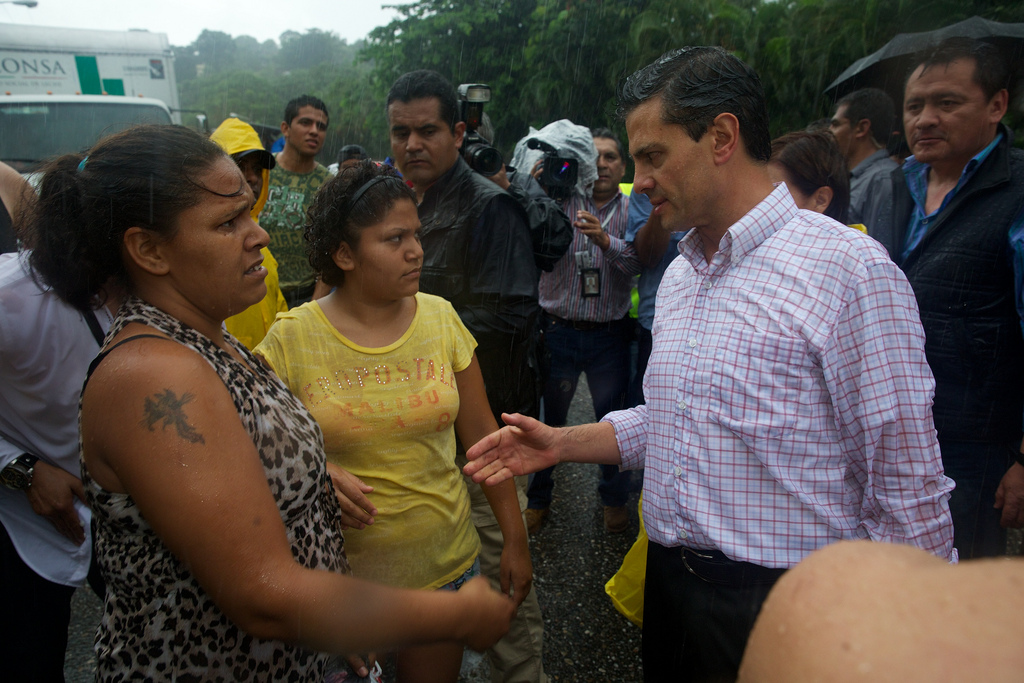
President Enrique Peña Nieto and Secretary of the Interior Miguel Ángel Osorio Chong visit affected zones around Acapulco de Juárez on 16 September 2013.

At least 97 people were killed throughout Guerrero. Approximately 30,000 dwellings were damaged, including 11,591 houses sustained severe damage. Moreover, at least 11,000 homes were destroyed 20,000 people were evacuated to shelters. 12,000 of which were evacuated to 47 shelters. Overall, 24 rivers flooded, at least 32 roads sustained damage, and four bridges collapsed.

In La Pintada, a remote fishing village of around 400 residents situated to the west of Acapulco, a mudslide occurred on September 14, which within a few minutes, swept through the center of town. As such, many residents initially wandered throughout town in a state of panic and confusion; it took two days for word of the mudslide to spread to the public. Throughout the village, 71 people were killed. Over half the town, including 20 homes, were demolished due to the mudslide. A total of 334 people were evacuated by police, though 30 elected to stay in the area until all the victims had been identified. Many surviving citizens of La Pintada were also hurt, including one seriously.

In the municipality of Atlamajalcingo, a woman died after a collapse of a dwelling. In Chilpancingo, the capital of Guerrero, four people perished. Numerous trees were downed and power outages were reported. Additionally, the nearby Cerrito Rico dam nearly overflowed its banks. In the Tecpan municipality, four rivers overflowed their banks and six people died because of landslides. Many mountainous communities were isolated, thus making in difficult to receive aid.

==== Acapulco ====
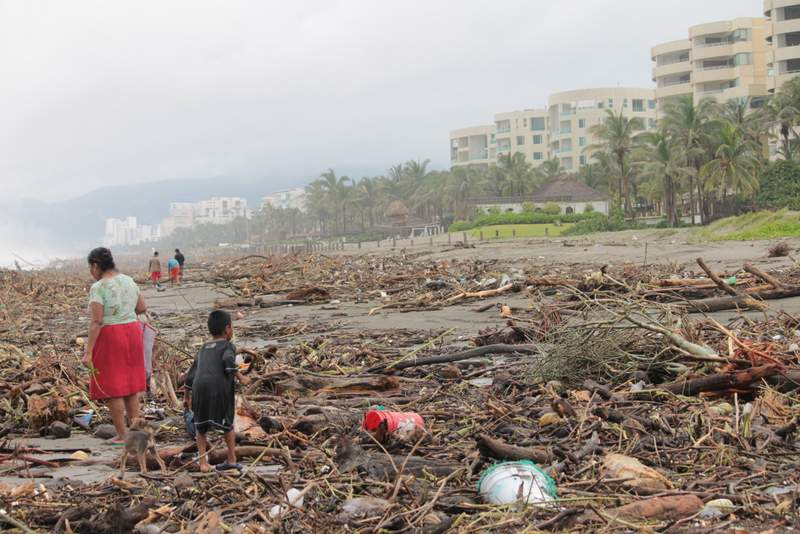
Debris on beach in the Acapulco Diamante area.

The city of Acapulco sustained the worst damage from the storm; the damage in Acapulco was described by the National Broadcasting Company as the "worst storm damage to hit Mexico in years". There, 18 fatalities occurred, including one person that died when a wall collapsed. Nearby, six tourists perished in a car crash, including two minors. The crash also damaged two fences, a boat, and injured two people. Several homes were flooded in nearby neighborhoods of Acapulco when a nearby river overflowed its banks. Isolated incidents of vandalism were reported. Two mudslides were reported, resulting in the destruction of a home and the closure of a few roads. A family of six perished in Acapulco when a landslide demolished their home. At least 40,000 tourists who spent the Mexican Independence Day in Acapulco were stranded since the terminal of the airport was underwater. Furthermore, the main roads out of the city were blocked by landslides. Even though by September 19, the military had evacuated 10,000 people via 100 flights to Mexico City, this process was difficult because the radar was not functioning. Citywide, 13,516 dwellings were damaged.

=== Colima ===
Although flooding was minor in Colima, a peak rainfall total of 144 mm (5.7 in) was measured in Chanal. Many families were evacuated. Several dams statewide reached their maximum capacity while numerous roads that led to the Manzanillo airport were closed. In Ixtlahuacán, 50 families were evacuated when a river threatened to overflow its banks; thirty others were taken to shelter in the rest of the state. A bridge collapsed in Villa de Alvarez. One man was killed in the state when he unsuccessfully attempted to cross a river. Four trees were brought down. Around 15,000 ha (58 sq mi) of banana crop was wiped out. In all, the municipalities of Ixtlahuacán, Tecomán, Manzanillo, and Comala Coquimatlán sustained the worst effects from Manuel in the state. Manuel was considered the worst storm to hit the Mexican state since the 1959 Mexico hurricane. Damage in the state exceeded $479 million pesos ($36.8 million 2013 USD).

=== Jalisco ===
Further north, minor flooding was reported in Jalisco. Statewide, four people were killed. A 26-year-old man died after being swept away by in the village of Juanacatlan while a 12-year-old boy drowned after falling in a dam in the municipality of Teocuitatlan de Corona. Another man perished when he drove his car into a ravine in Cuautitlan de Garcia Barragan. Fifteen hundred people were evacuated from their homes. Classes were briefly cancelled in 588 schools, leaving over 40,000 pupils home. Bridges collapsed in the Jalisco towns of Zacoalco de Torres and Tamazula de Gordiano. The worst-hit areas in the state were the southern and coastal areas of the state, as well as the Guadalajara area, where flooding and landslides occurred in some neighborhoods. Through Jalisco, 56 municipalities sustained damage.

=== Sinaloa ===
Just before its second landfall, one fisherman was killed in Tepechitlán. Another casualty occurred when a person fell off a shrimp boat. A truck driver and a 5 year old also died, while the toddler's mother was considered missing. The towns of Escuinapa, El Rosario, and Mazatlán, as well as the municipalities of Angostura, Mocorito, Navolato, and Culiacán sustained flooded, resulting in modest damage. In Angostura, numerous people were trapped on the roofs of their houses. Coastal areas of Navolato were flooded while authorities reported 500 homeless; hundreds of threes were toppled and power lines were disconnected. Parts of Mocorito were isolated due to overflow of the Humaya channel. About 2 m (6.6 ft) of water and debris was reported in Mocorito. In Culiacán, minor flooding happened. Meanwhile, in Chinito, almost all roads were destroyed. Offshore, 24 boats were damaged. Throughout the state, 100,000 people were rendered as homeless. A total of 3,000 persons were evacuated to 62 shelters. In all, 70 communities were damaged by the tropical cyclone. Hurricane Manuel directly affected 146,000 persons in 10 municipalities in the state. Damage in Sinaloa totaled $500 million pesos ($37.9 million 2013 USD).

=== Elsewhere ===
Elsewhere, in Michoacán, flooding was reported; many people had to be rescued via air and two casualties were reported. In Durango, 42 homes were damaged, stranding 50 residents. While brushing the Baja California Peninsula, 2 ft (0.61 m) waves were measured in La Paz in addition to winds of 26 mph (42 km/h). In Sinaloa, a peak rainfall total of 415 mm (15 in) was recorded at Culiacán. After dissipating, the remnants of Manuel brought copious amounts of rainfall to a wide swath of Texas. The precipitation was further enhanced by deepening moisture from the Gulf of Mexico and an approaching cold front. In the Austin area, the rains resulted in localized flooding, forcing the closure of several low water crossings. A weather station in Camp Mabry recorded 2.92 in (74 mm) of rain on September 20, making it a daily record for the station. Elsewhere, radar estimates indicated that as much as 8 in (200 mm) may have fallen in localized areas in West Texas. In Kimble County, one road was closed due to flooding. Across central Arkansas, 2–4.5 in (51–114 mm) of rainfall was recorded.

== Aftermath ==
Known Pacific hurricanes that have killed at least 100 people
Hurricane	Season	Fatalities	Ref.
"Mexico"	1959	1,800	
Paul	1982	1,625	
Liza	1976	1,263	
Tara	1961	436	
Pauline	1997	230–400	
Agatha	2010	204	
Manuel	2013	169	
Tico	1983	141	
Ismael	1995	116	
"Lower California"	1931	110	
"Mazatlán"	1943	100	
Lidia	1981	100	

During the aftermath of the storm, a state of emergency was declared for Acapulco; about 12,000 items were airlifted to the region. overall. In all, 662 donation centers were opened across Guerrero. Damages repairs to Guerrero totaled to $3 billion MXN ($123 million 2013 USD). The Minister of Economy granted an additional $100 million pesos to the devastated state. Furthermore, the Finance Ministry declared it had $12 billion pesos (US$925.60 million) available in funds. In addition, the Mexican Red Cross collected and subsequently delivered cargo to the devastated area, especially Guerrero while also providing 400,079 tons of aid. Local authorities also provided 29,000 tons of personal and household items. The Médicos Sin Fronteras distributed 2,800 L (620 imp gal) of water, food, and medicines in five shelters. A total of €8 million (US$118 million), from the National Fund for Natural Disasters, were allocated to provide essential items such as food, mattresses, drinking water, and medicine. The Water Missions International provided water to about 20,000 persons. World Vision Mexico disturbed plastic tends to help cover roofs for 80 families. Furthermore, the organization donated mosquito nets for 76 families. Grocery items such as rice, oil, sardines, sugar, salt, cookies, and beans were also provided. ADRA Mexico was one of the first organizations to help victims, and by early October, had helped 8,000 people.

In Oaxaca, 42 municipalities were declared disaster areas. Throughout the state of Guerrero, 56 municipalities were declared a disaster area while 9 municipalities in Michoacán were declared a disaster zone. In all, 428 municipalities were designated as disaster areas and 155 emergencies declarations were issued due to both Ingrid and Manuel. State of emergencies were declared in Michoacán and 21 municipalities in Jalisco, though by mid-October, they were lifted.

Thirty-two damage assessment committees were installed to help estimate and analyze the cost of damage to public infrastructure. Subcommittees were established to help assess damage to schools, houses, and water supplies. Ten shelters were opened in both Chilpancingo and Acapulco. All survivors form the La Pintada mudslide were transported to a basketball gym in Acapulco, who were all provided with a US$150 pension. Due to the closure of the commercial terminal of the Acapulco airport, special flights provided by Aeroméxico and Interjet were used to deliver aid.

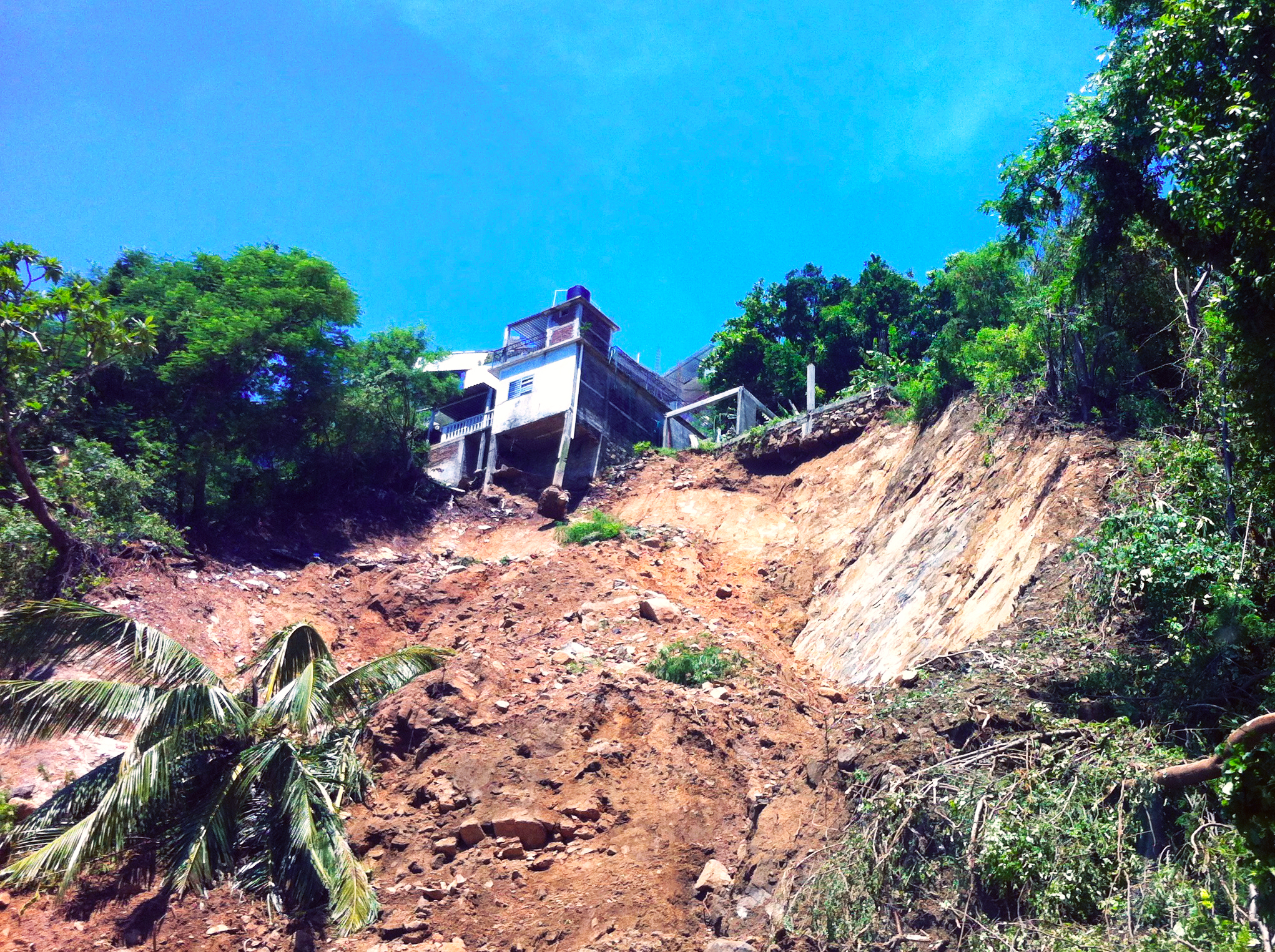
Landslide in the highway Acapulco–Pie de la Cuesta, Guerrero

By September 18, power services had been restored to the state of Guerrero. That day, gas and water services were revived in Acapulco. Emergency declarations were requested in Angostura and Navolato. Within 12 hours after its second landfall, power was retrieved to 26,000 dwellings in Sinaloa. In La Pintada, the search process for victims was halted briefly due to the threat of another mudslide, but on September 20, 100 rescuers resumed searching, who frequently had to dig through mud to recover bodies.

The Mexican government received criticism by the press for being under-prepared for both Manuel and Ingrid. One newspaper said that the authorities underestimated both storms, due to a combination of a "lack of coordination" and "the distraction of the weekend's independence-related festivities." Guerrero governor Angel Aguirre was criticized by many for attending a night-long party and drinking when the storm first threatened the state. However, Aguirre later acknowledged political corruption, as well as the construction of homes and hotels in unsafe areas in a televised speech. Consequently, the Mexican Senate requested an investigation in the amount of preparation that occurred.

To cope with relief efforts, Mexican Army troops and marines forces helped families whose homes were flooded. Additionally, the military provided 60 tonnes (132,275 lb) of food supplies and 8,000 litres (1,760 imp gal) of water to the city. A military airbase was installed to transport aid via air. Authorities rushed to clean rocks and other debris from two highways in order to liberate Acapulco from isolation. The disaster also resulted in panic buying at supermarkets. Looters were spotted in Acapulco many angry victims robbed shops, homes, luxury hotels, and apartments. Marines were posted outside stores to prevent further theft. Mexico President Enrique Peña Nieto toured through most of the devastated areas, promising to rebuild La Pintada and Acapulco. On May 26, 2014, La Pintada was re-opened, with 125 new homes.

Because of the severe damage caused by the storm in Mexico, the name Manuel was retired by the World Meteorological Organization following the 2013 season, and will never be used again for an eastern Pacific tropical cyclone. It was replaced with Mario for the 2019 season.

== See also ==
- Tropical cyclones in 2013
- List of Category 1 Pacific hurricanes
- Hurricane Ismael (1995) – A similar storm that made landfall near the same area as a Category 1 hurricane, also got retired
- Hurricane Willa (2018) – Made landfall in the same area as Manuel, but much stronger
- Hurricane Otis (2023) – A much more powerful and costly storm that made landfall near Acapulco as a Category 5 hurricane
