= Hurricane Ingrid =

Category 1 Atlantic hurricane in 2013

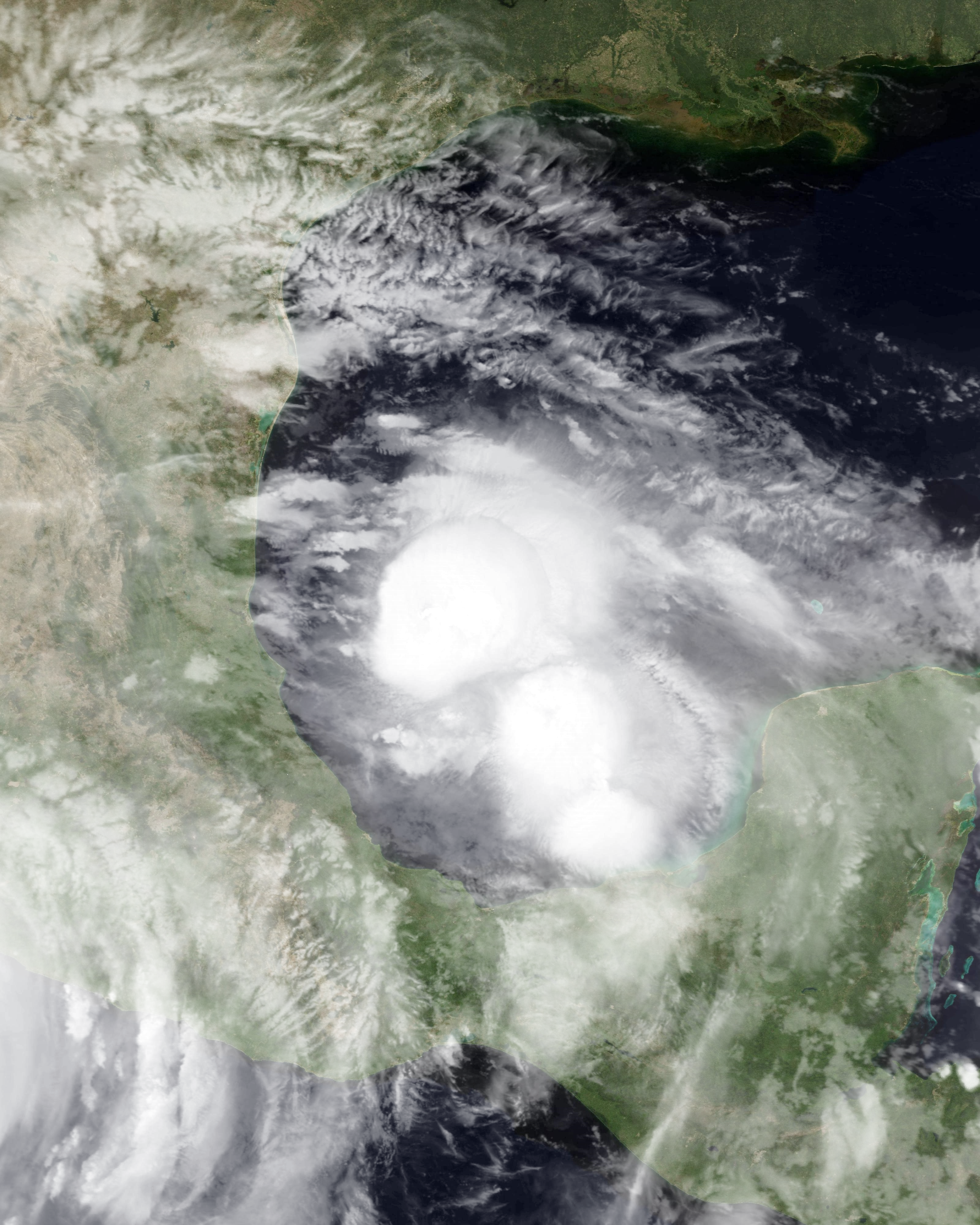
- Ingrid shortly after reaching peak intensity on September 14

Meteorological history
- Formed: September 12, 2013
- Dissipated: September 17, 2013

Category 1 hurricane
- 1-minute sustained (SSHWS/NWS)
- Highest winds: 85 mph (140 km/h)
- Lowest pressure: 983 mbar (hPa); 29.03 inHg

Overall effects
- Fatalities: 32 total
- Damage: $1.5 billion (2013 USD)
- Areas affected: Mexico, Texas
- IBTrACS
- Part of the 2013 Atlantic hurricane season

Hurricane Ingrid was one of two tropical cyclones, along with Hurricane Manuel, to affect Mexico within a 24-hour period, the first such occurrence since 1958. Ingrid was the ninth named storm and second hurricane of the 2013 Atlantic hurricane season. It formed on September 12 in the Gulf of Mexico from a broad disturbance that also spawned Manuel in the eastern Pacific. After initially moving westward toward Veracruz, Ingrid turned northeastward away from the coast. Favorable conditions allowed it to attain hurricane status on September 14, and the next day Ingrid attained peak winds of 140 km/h (85 mph). Subsequently, increased wind shear weakened the convection as the storm turned more to the northwest and west. On September 16, Ingrid made landfall just south of La Pesca, Tamaulipas in northeastern Mexico as a strong tropical storm, and dissipated the next day. The hurricane was also the last one to form in the Gulf of Mexico until Hurricane Hermine in 2016.

The combined impacts of hurricanes Ingrid and Manuel affected two-thirds of Mexico, killing 192 people and causing MXN$75 billion, or roughly US$5.7 billion in damage. Most of the effects were due to Manuel, though Ingrid was directly responsible for at least 32 deaths and $20 billion (MXN, US$1.5 billion) in damage. The two storms precipitated 162 billion m^{3} (162 km^{3}; 5.7 trillion ft^{3}; 39 mi^{3}) of water, the equivalent of filling every dam in Mexico. Rainfall from the storm peaked at 511 mm (20.1 in) in Tuxpan, Veracruz. The rains caused widespread flooding, damaging at least 14,000 houses and hundreds of roads and bridges. In Tamaulipas, where the storm made landfall, the rainfall damaged crops and flooded rivers. The effects of the storm spread into South Texas, causing high tides and some flooding. After the storm, the Mexican government declared several municipalities to be in states of emergency. Relief agencies distributed food and aid to the hardest hit areas, although in Tamaulipas, residents had to rely on assistance from the local Gulf Cartel. The names Ingrid and Manuel were both later retired due to their impacts.

== Meteorological history ==
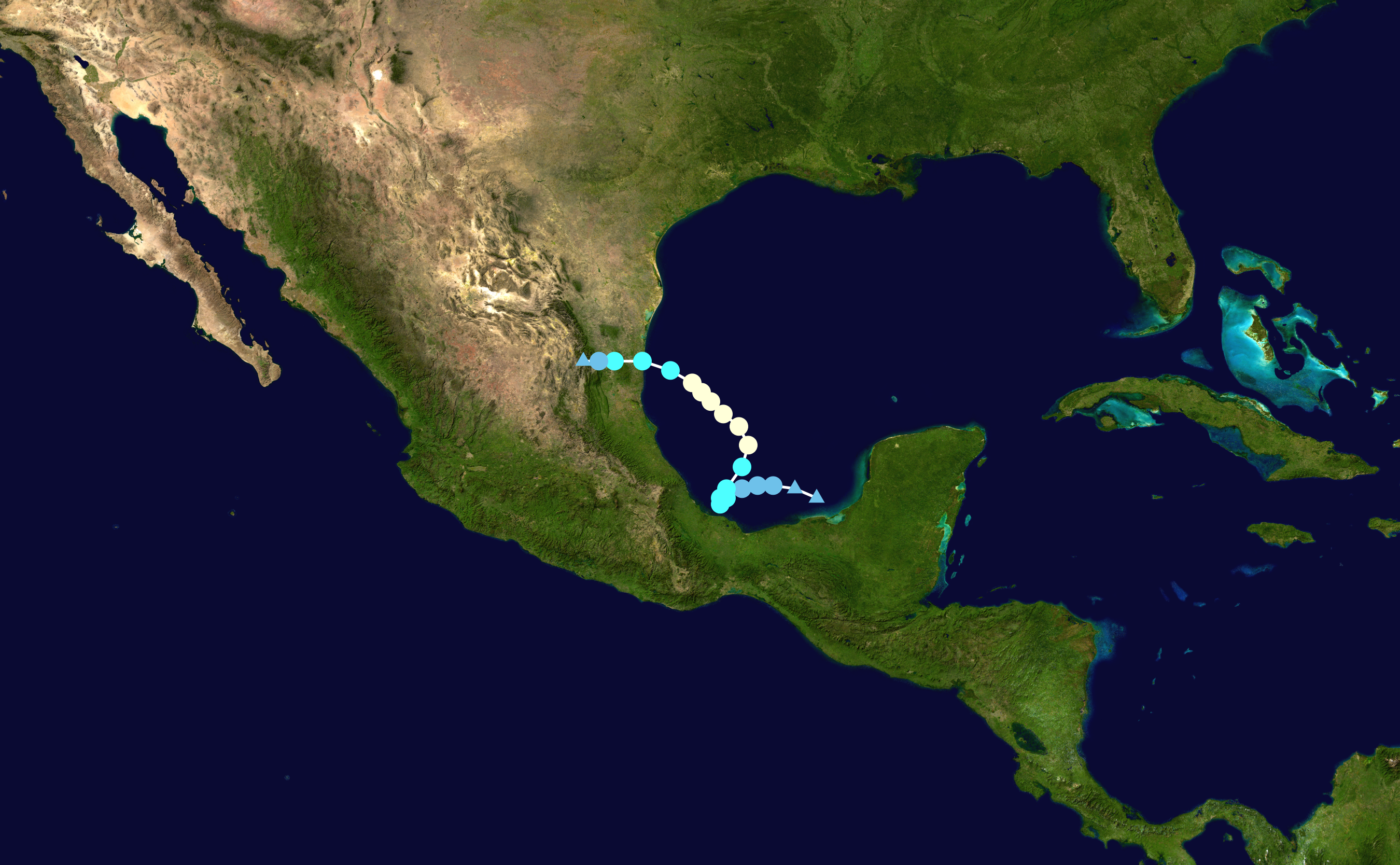
Map plotting the storm's track and intensity, according to the Saffir–Simpson scale Map key Saffir–Simpson scale Tropical depression (≤38 mph, ≤62 km/h) Tropical storm (39–73 mph, 63–118 km/h) Category 1 (74–95 mph, 119–153 km/h) Category 2 (96–110 mph, 154–177 km/h) Category 3 (111–129 mph, 178–208 km/h) Category 4 (130–156 mph, 209–251 km/h) Category 5 (≥157 mph, ≥252 km/h) Unknown Storm type Tropical cyclone Subtropical cyclone Extratropical cyclone, remnant low, tropical disturbance, or monsoon depression

On August 28, a tropical wave exited the west coast of Africa, which moved westward across the Atlantic Ocean without development. On September 2, an area of convection, or thunderstorms, developed along the northern portion of the wave, but was eventually absorbed into Tropical Storm Gabrielle north of Puerto Rico. The wave continued westward through the Caribbean Sea into a large area of cyclonic flow at the surface, which extended across Central America into the eastern Pacific. Around September 9, the broad system developed two areas of disturbed weather – one in the eastern Pacific would become Hurricane Manuel, and the other developing over the northwestern Caribbean. The latter system slowly organized, developing a low pressure area on September 11. Subsequently, the system moved over the Yucatán Peninsula. Although land interaction prevented immediate development, conditions favored further development in the Bay of Campeche. Early on September 12, the low emerged into the bay, and at 1800 UTC the National Hurricane Center (NHC) assessed that Tropical Depression Ten developed about 280 km (170 mi) east-northeast of Veracruz. This was confirmed by a Hurricane Hunters flight indicating the presence of a closed low-level circulation.

On September 13, convection and organization increased and the depression strengthened into Tropical Storm Ingrid, while weak steering currents resulted in little movement of the cyclone. Partially due to the presence of nearby Hurricane Manuel in the eastern Pacific basin on the other side of Mexico, significant wind shear existed in the vicinity of Ingrid. Nonetheless, strong convection and intermittent development of an eye allowed for strengthening of the storm on September 14. Ingrid strengthened into a hurricane – the second of the season – that afternoon. Around that time, the hurricane turned sharply northeastward due to a trough over eastern Mexico and a ridge over the southeastern United States. Additional strengthening took place thereafter, and Ingrid reached a peak intensity of 140 km/h (85 mph) early on September 15 while starting to move northward and begin a northwest turn towards the Mexican coastline.

Afterward Ingrid reached peak winds, shear increased and began to weaken the hurricane as it approached the Mexican coast. The center became displaced to the edge of the convection, and NHC forecaster Daniel Brown noted that Ingrid "[did] not resemble a classic hurricane in satellite pictures." At around 1115 UTC on September 16, Ingrid made landfall just south of La Pesca, Tamaulipas in northeastern Mexico, after having weakened into a strong tropical storm with 100 km/h (65 mph) winds. Near landfall, the Hurricane Hunters reported flight-level winds of 120 km/h (75 mph) which, after adjusting to surface winds, confirmed the weakening. The storm moved ashore less than 24 hours after Tropical Storm Manuel struck the Pacific coast of Mexico on Michoacán, making it the first time since 1958 that tropical cyclones struck both coasts of the country within one day. Ingrid rapidly weakened into a tropical depression over land, and although convection temporarily reorganized, the circulation dissipated on September 17.

== Preparations and impact ==
Ingrid (right) and Tropical Storm Manuel (left) over Mexico on September 15

Several tropical cyclone warnings and watches were posted in anticipation of the storm. Upon the development of Ingrid into a tropical cyclone at 2100 UTC on September 12, the Government of Mexico issued a tropical storm warning from Coatzacoalcos to Nautla, Veracruz. At 1500 UTC on September 13, the tropical storm warning was extended northward to Cabo Rojo, Veracruz, with a tropical storm watch northward to La Pesca, Tamaulipas. Later, a hurricane warning was issued between Cabo Rojo to La Pesca, with a tropical storm watch to Bahia Algodones, Tamaulipas. Pemex, the oil company operated by the Mexican government, evacuated workers from three platforms in the Gulf of Mexico due to the storm. In Tamaulipas, classes were canceled in 27 municipalities, and all classes were temporarily canceled throughout Veracruz. The threat of the storm caused events for Mexican Independence Day to be canceled. After a restriction on the news in 2010 due to the local drug war, members of a citizen alert system in Tamaulipas used Twitter to notify about flooding, missing people, and the need for assistance.

Early in its duration, Ingrid produced tropical storm force winds along the coast of Veracruz. While making landfall, it also brought tropical storm force winds along the northeastern Mexican coast. Sustained winds at La Pesca peaked at 80 km/h (50 mph), with gusts to 105 km/h (65 mph). The NHC remarked that Ingrid "likely caused above normal tides" in northeastern Mexico, but there was no data to back up the statement. Interacting with Hurricane Manuel on the Pacific coast and the broad cyclonic flow, Ingrid dropped heavy rainfall across eastern Mexico, primarily in Tabasco, Veracruz, and Tamaulipas states. In Tuxpan, Veracruz, rainfall totaled 511 mm (20.1 in) over 10 days, while at the Presa Vicente Guerrero dam in Tamaulipas, precipitation reached 502 mm (19.8 in). Surface runoff from the storm spread to the Pacific coast of Mexico, producing flooding in Guerrero in combination with Manuel. The impacts from both storms produced 162 billion m^{3} (5.7 trillion ft^{3}) of water, the equivalent of filling every dam in the country.

The combined effects of hurricanes Ingrid and Manuel affected about two-thirds of Mexico. The rains from Ingrid caused flooding and landslides across Mexico, causing many rivers to rise, and isolating towns. In Veracruz alone, the rains flooded 68 rivers, which damaged 121 roads and 31 bridges, including two destroyed bridges. About 14,000 houses were damaged to some degree. Heavy rainfall forced 23,000 people to evacuate their homes, 9,000 of whom went to emergency shelters, some forced to leave by the Mexican army in high risk areas. Evacuees who did not reside in shelters generally went to the houses of friends and family. Also in Veracruz, flooding killed about 20,000 livestock. Along the coast of Tamaulipas, damage occurred from Soto la Marina to La Pesca. The Pánuco River in Tamaulipas rose above its banks, flooding two poor towns along its path and damaging adjacent roads. Also in the state, the storm damaged local sorghum fields. Two people in the state required rescue after their truck was swept away by a river.

Throughout Mexico, Ingrid killed 32 people, mostly due to flooding and mudslides. The two storms collectively killed at least 192 people and caused MXN$75 (US$ 5.7 billion). Manuel was responsible for majority of the overall effects, although Ingrid still left an estimated MXN$20 billion (US$1.5 billion) in estimated economic losses, according to AON Benfield; insured damages totaled MXN$3 billion (US$230 million). A total of six fatalities occurred in the states of Hidalgo and Puebla. Three of which were caused after a vehicle was swept off a road, while three other people died after their home was buried by a mudslide; another death occurred in Hidalgo after a house collapsed on a woman in the town of Tepehuacán de Guerrero. Twelve people died after a landslide smashed a bus in Altotonga, Veracruz, and three people died in Tamaulipas.

The fringes of the storm extended into southern Texas, where winds gusted to tropical storm force, and rainfall was around 25–75 mm (0.98–2.95 in). Thunderstorms and high tides affected the coastline, with tides reaching 0.76 m (2.5 ft) above normal, causing beaches to close due to flooding.

== Aftermath ==
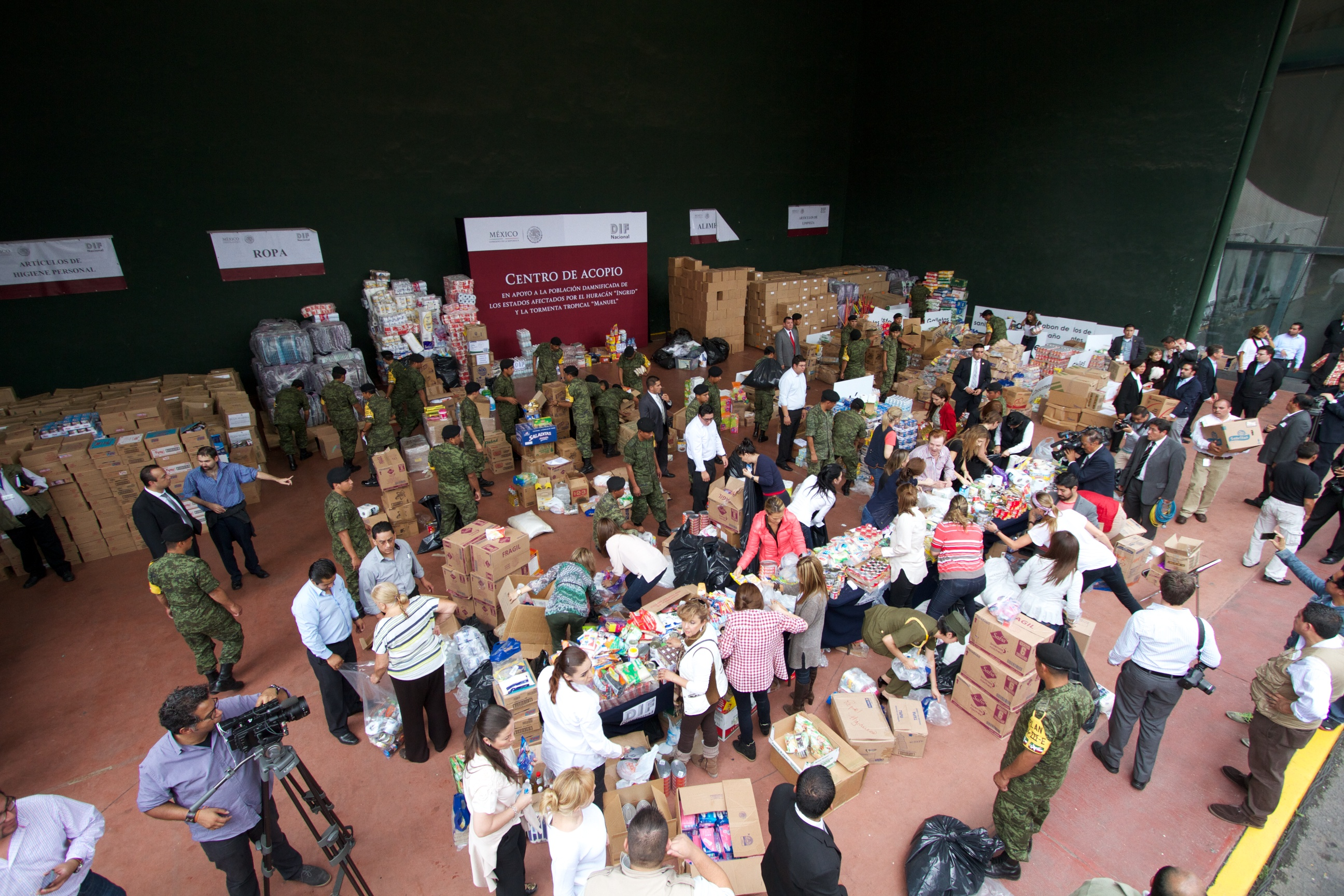
Food and supplies donation drive for the victims of Hurricanes Ingrid and Manuel at the Campo Marte, September 18

The combined impacts of hurricanes Ingrid and Manuel prompted officials in Mexico to declare a state of emergency in 155 municipalities in Veracruz, Tamaulipas, Chiapas, Oaxaca, Guerrero, and Chihuahua. The nation's Health Ministry sent medical crews across the country to affected areas in an effort to prevent the spread of disease; the agency also suggested residents boil their water. Officials opened shelters in Tamaulipas for residents whose houses were damaged, housing about 2,000 people in the weeks following the storm. The Mexican food bank sent about 800 tons of food to the hardest-hit parts of the country in Guerrero, Veracruz, and Sinaloa. In addition, the Mexican Red Cross delivered 186 tons of food to Veracruz alone. Volunteers delivered about 600 blankets and various cleaning supplies to the town of Pánuco. Following the storms, the National Civil Protection Coordination received the authority to prevent housing construction in areas at risk for mudslides and flooding; the law had passed in 2012, but initially lacked the authority to enforce it. Some residents in Tamaulipas complained at the slow pace of receiving aid. In response, the Gulf Cartel brought relief items to Aldama, with one columnist for El Universal suggesting that this was to gain favor with local residents.

=== Retirement ===
Because of the severe damage caused by the storm in Mexico, the name Ingrid was later retired by the World Meteorological Organization in April 2014, and will never again be used for a North Atlantic hurricane. It was replaced with Imelda for the 2019 Atlantic hurricane season.

== See also ==
- Tropical cyclones in 2013
- List of Category 1 Atlantic hurricanes
- Hurricane Diana (1990) – a deadly Category 2 hurricane that struck eastern Mexico
- Hurricane Gert (1993) – another Category 2 hurricane that struck Mexico with similar results to Diana
- Hurricane Roxanne (1995) – a destructive Category 3 hurricane that took a similar erratic track
- Hurricane Bret (1999) – originated in the Gulf of Mexico and took a northward track, but attained Category 4 strength and struck southern Texas
- Hurricane Lorenzo (2007) – moved erratically in the Bay of Campeche before striking Veracruz as a Category 1 hurricane
- Hurricane Franklin (2017) – crossed the Yucatán Peninsula before hitting Veracruz as a Category 1 hurricane
