= 1958 Pacific hurricane season =

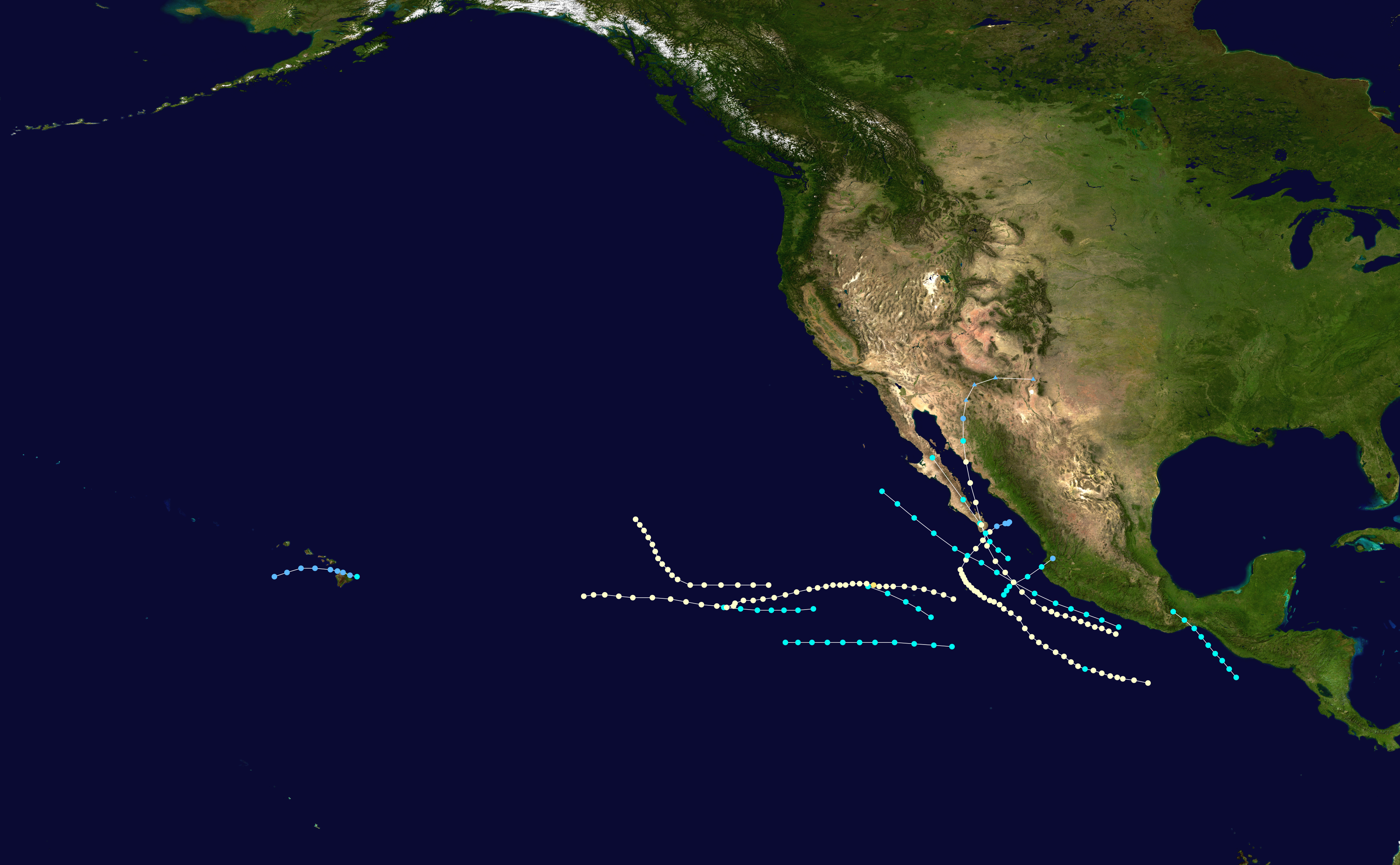
- Season summary map

Seasonal boundaries
- First system formed: June 6, 1958
- Last system dissipated: October 30, 1958

Strongest storm
- Name: Eleven
  - Maximum winds: 85 mph (140 km/h) (1-minute sustained)
  - Lowest pressure: 960 mbar (hPa; 28.35 inHg)

Seasonal statistics
- Total depressions: 14
- Total storms: 14
- Hurricanes: 6
- Major hurricanes (Cat. 3+): 0
- Total fatalities: Unknown
- Total damage: Unknown

Related articles
- 1958 Atlantic hurricane season; 1958 Pacific typhoon season; 1950s North Indian Ocean cyclone seasons

The 1958 Pacific hurricane season saw thirteen tropical systems. It officially started on May 15, 1958, in the eastern Pacific and lasted until November 30, 1958.

== Systems ==
=== Hurricane One ===
- Category 1 hurricane (SSHWS)
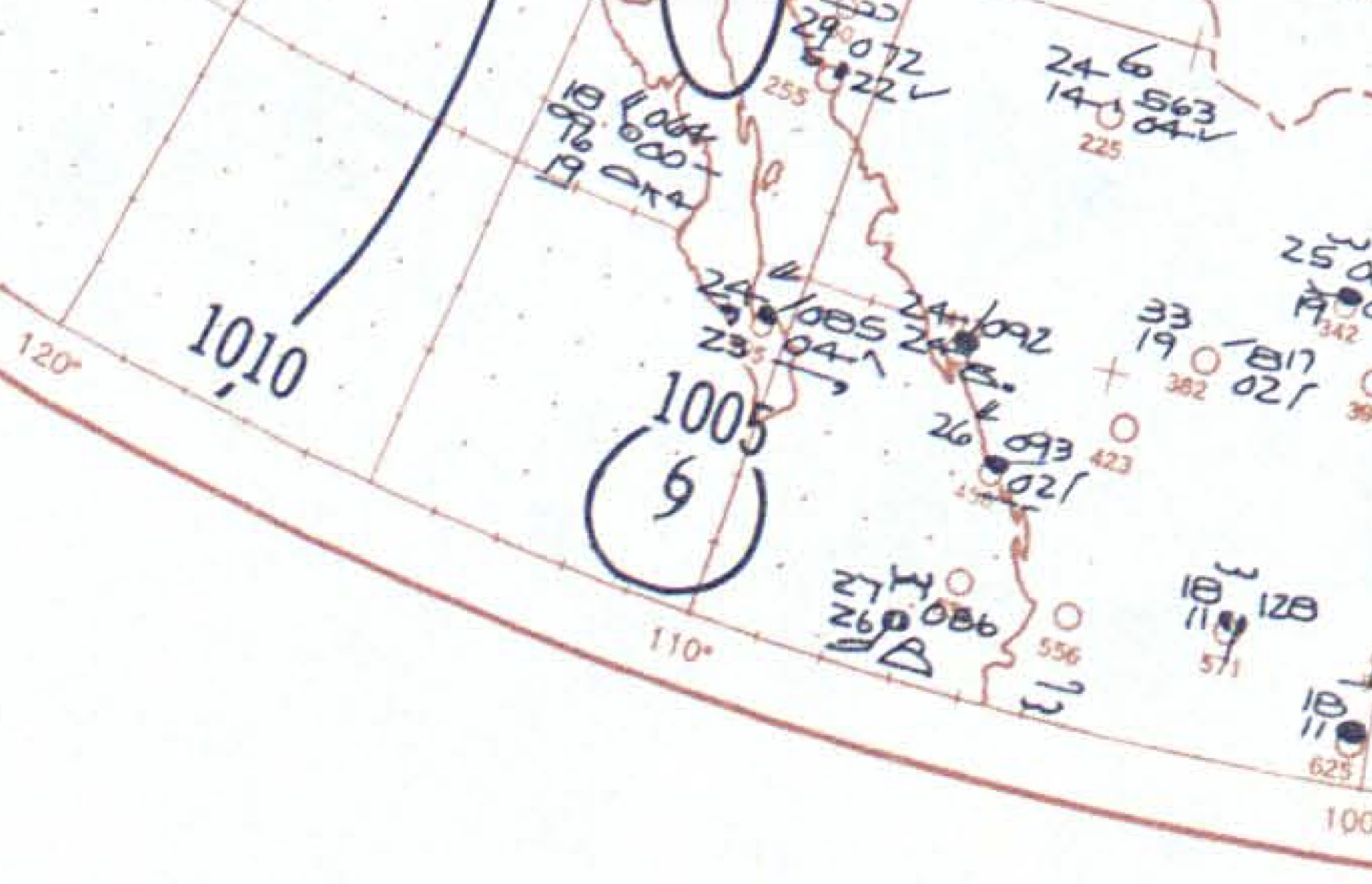
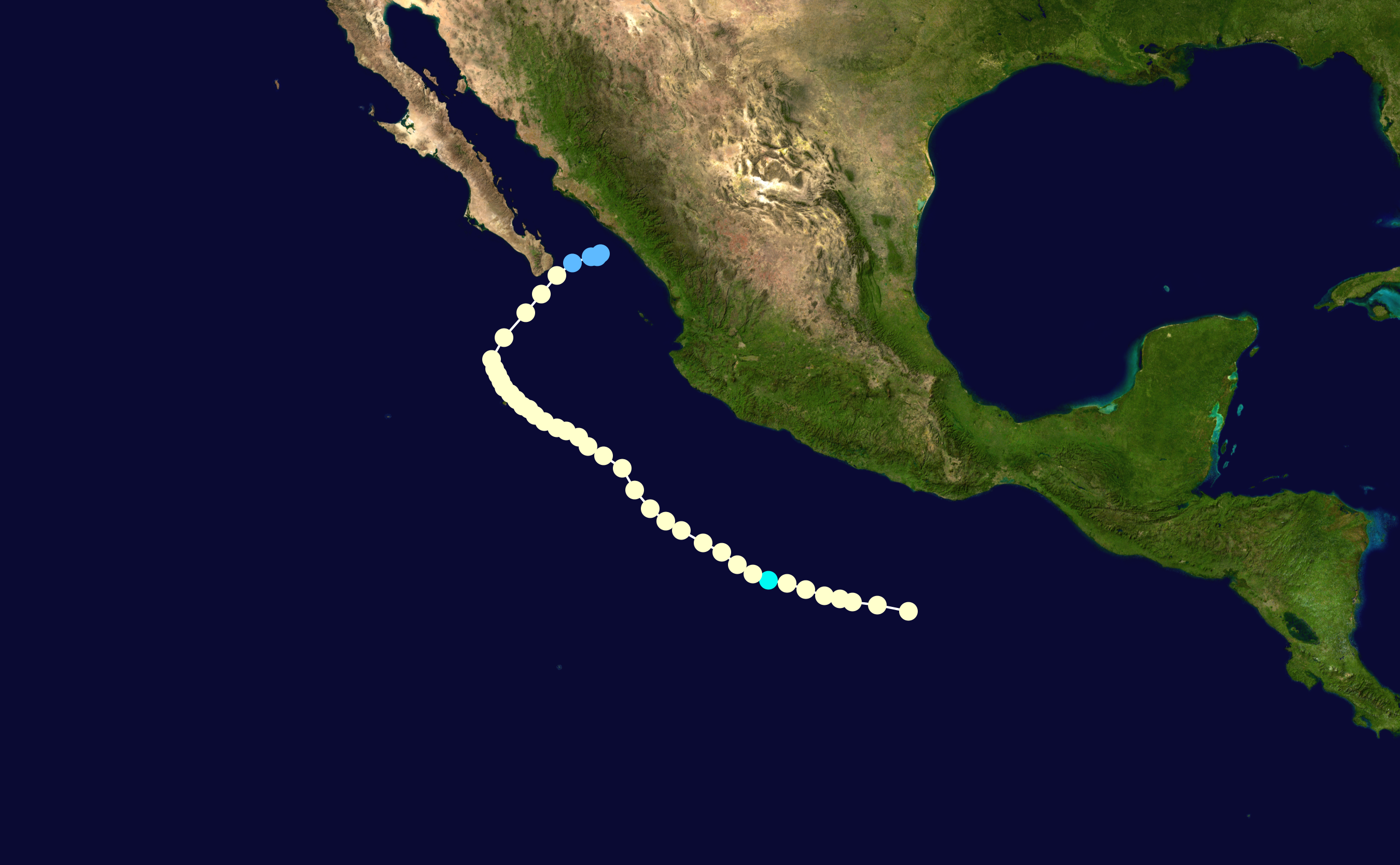
- Duration: June 6 – June 15
- Peak intensity: 85 mph (140 km/h) (1-min); 992 mbar (hPa)

On June 14, a tropical storm hit southern Mexico.

=== Tropical Storm Two ===
- Tropical storm (SSHWS)
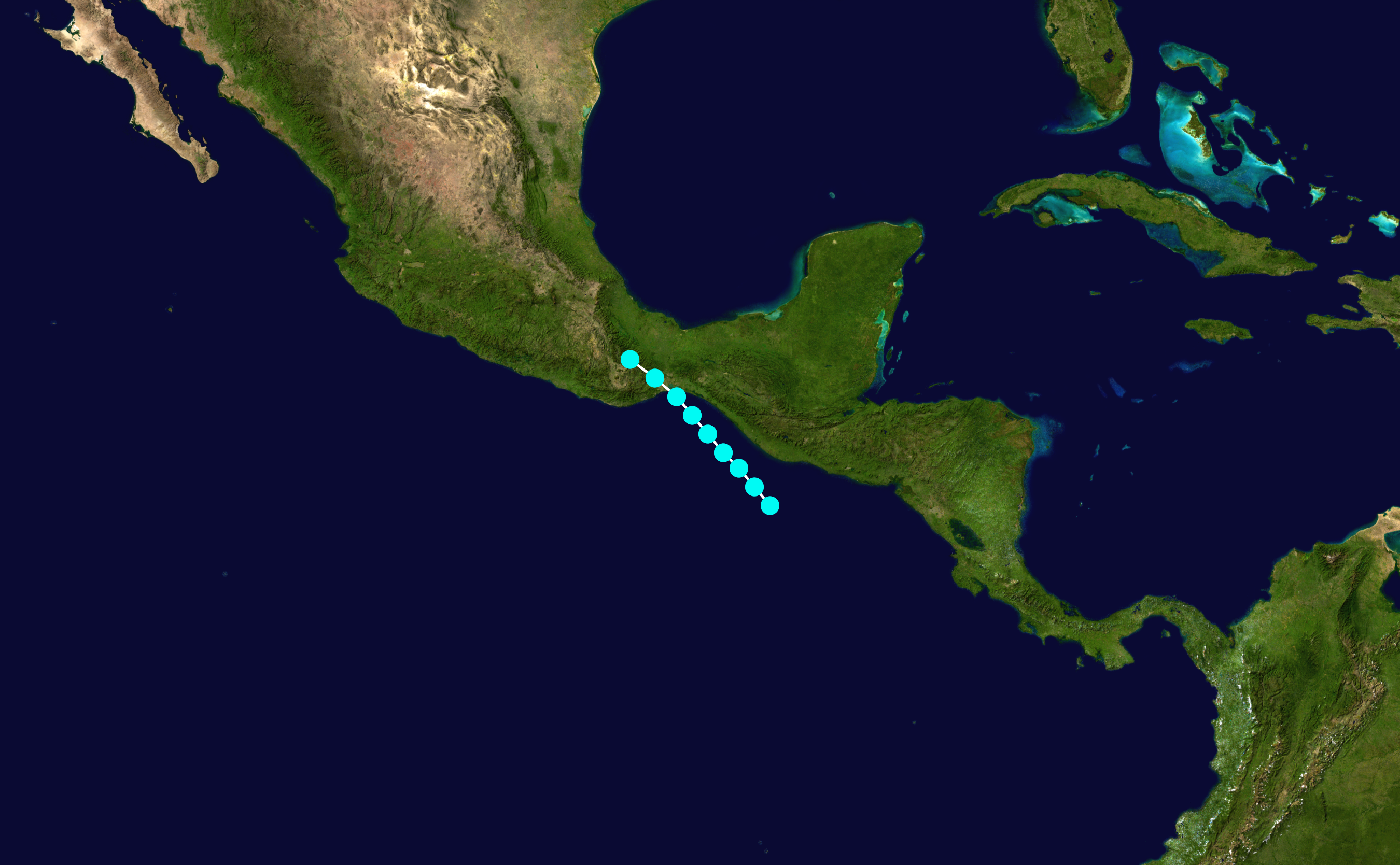
- Duration: June 13 – June 15
- Peak intensity: 50 mph (85 km/h) (1-min); 1000 mbar (hPa)

Tropical Storm Two existed from June 13 to June 15.

=== Hurricane Three ===
- Category 1 hurricane (SSHWS)
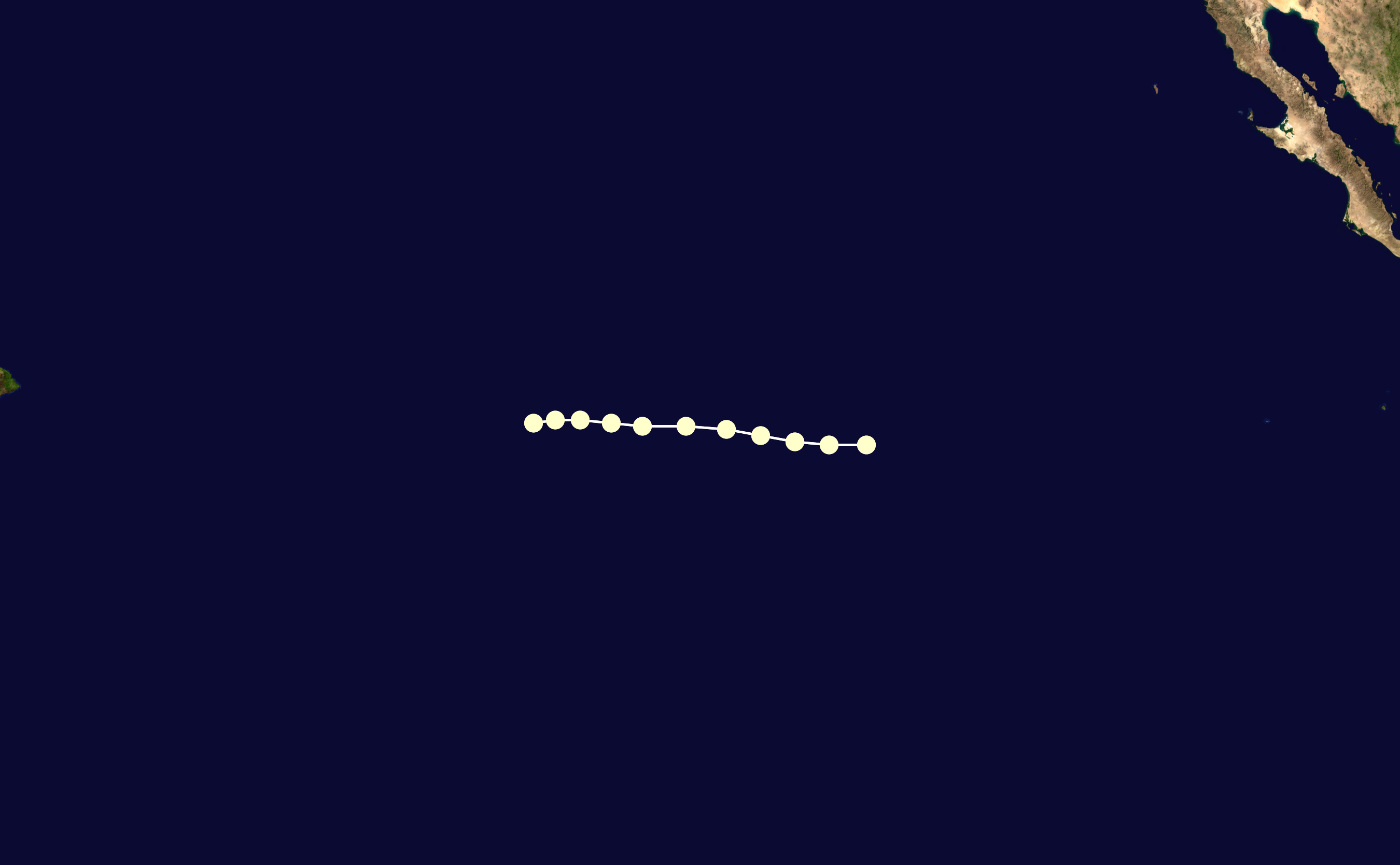
- Duration: July 19 – July 21
- Peak intensity: 85 mph (140 km/h) (1-min); 1002 mbar (hPa)

Hurricane Three existed from July 19 to July 21. Hurricane Three was of full hurricane strength when located on the 19th at 18N 129W by observations taken on the WAITEMATA. It traveled directly westward to about 18N 139W on the 21st.

=== Hurricane Four ===
- Category 1 hurricane (SSHWS)
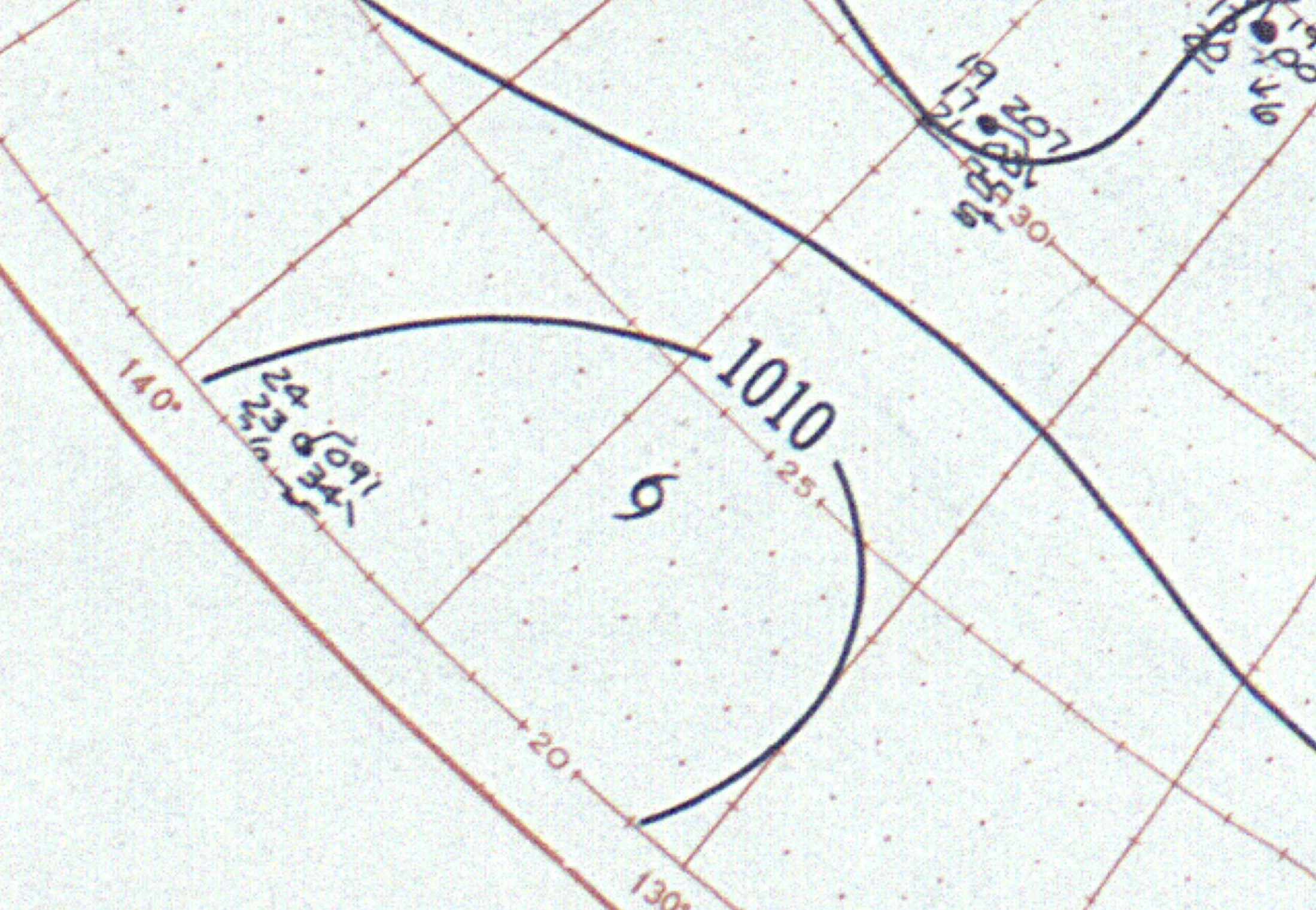
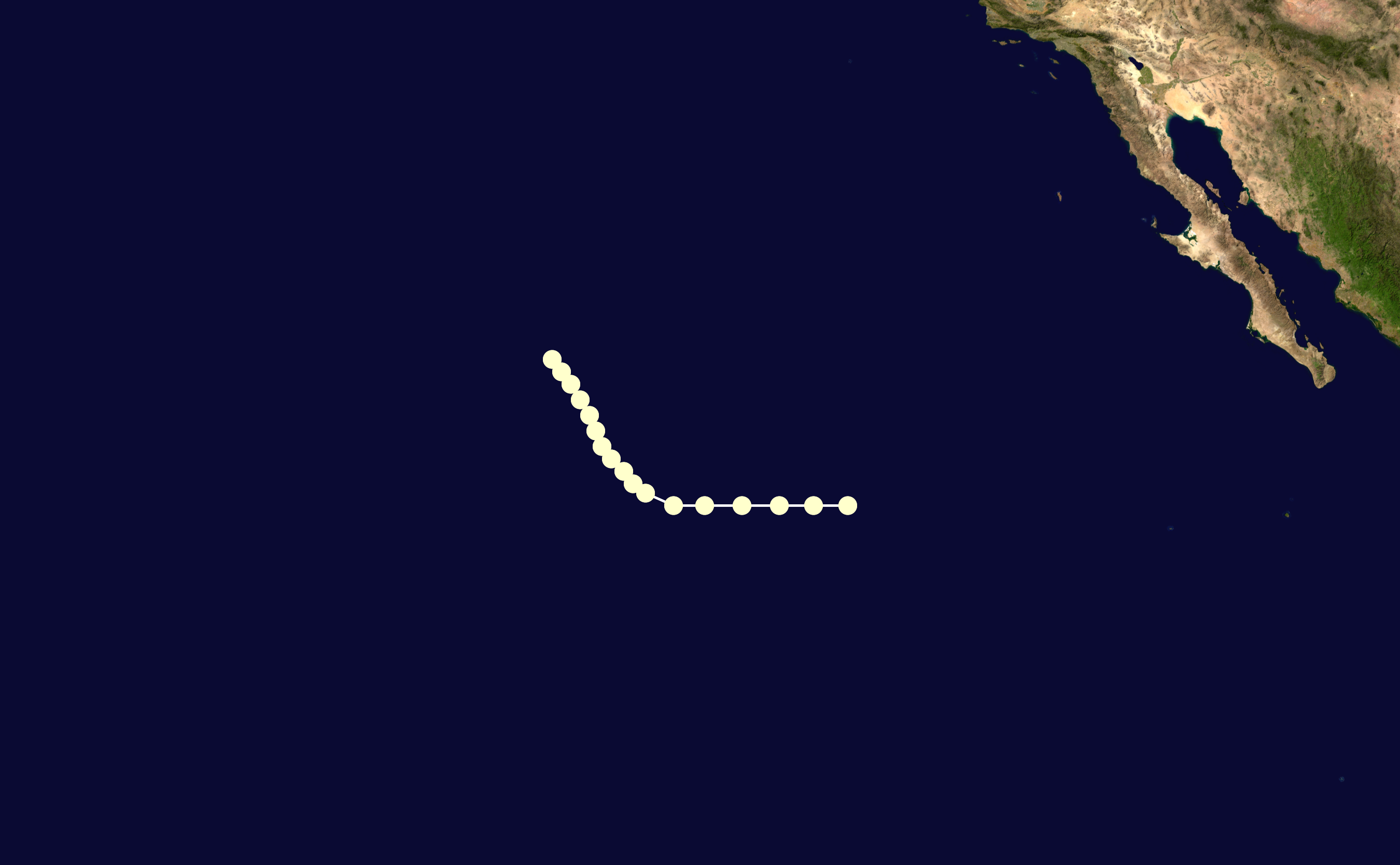
- Duration: July 21 – July 25
- Peak intensity: 85 mph (140 km/h) (1-min); 1005 mbar (hPa)

Hurricane Four existed from July 21 to July 25. A tropical storm built up at 19N 125W. This tropical storm moved westward and northwestward from the 21st. It became a hurricane on the 23rd near 19N 132W but only for a day. It continued northwestward to about 24N 136W on the 25th then degenerated to a squally area

=== Tropical Storm Five ===
- Tropical storm (SSHWS)
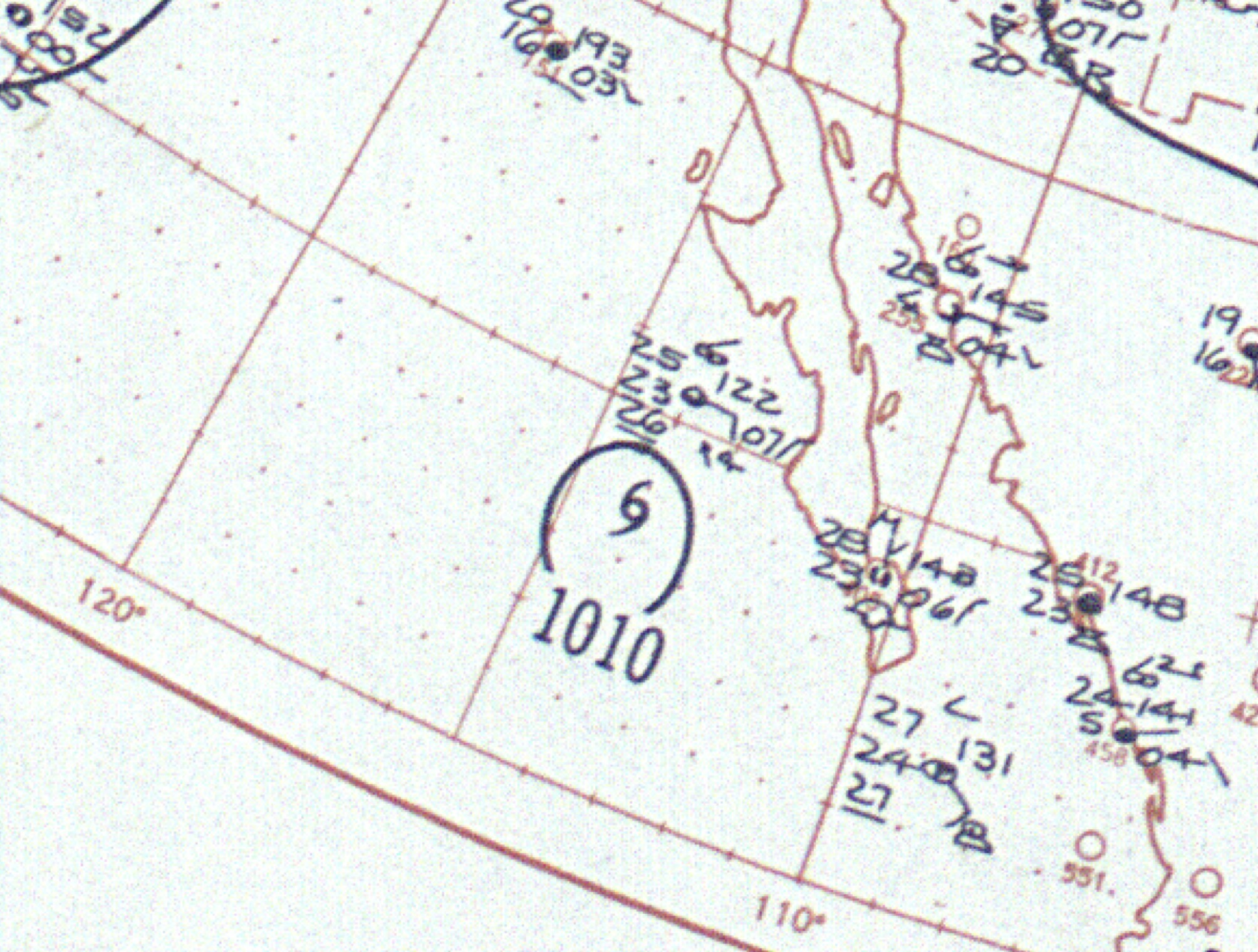
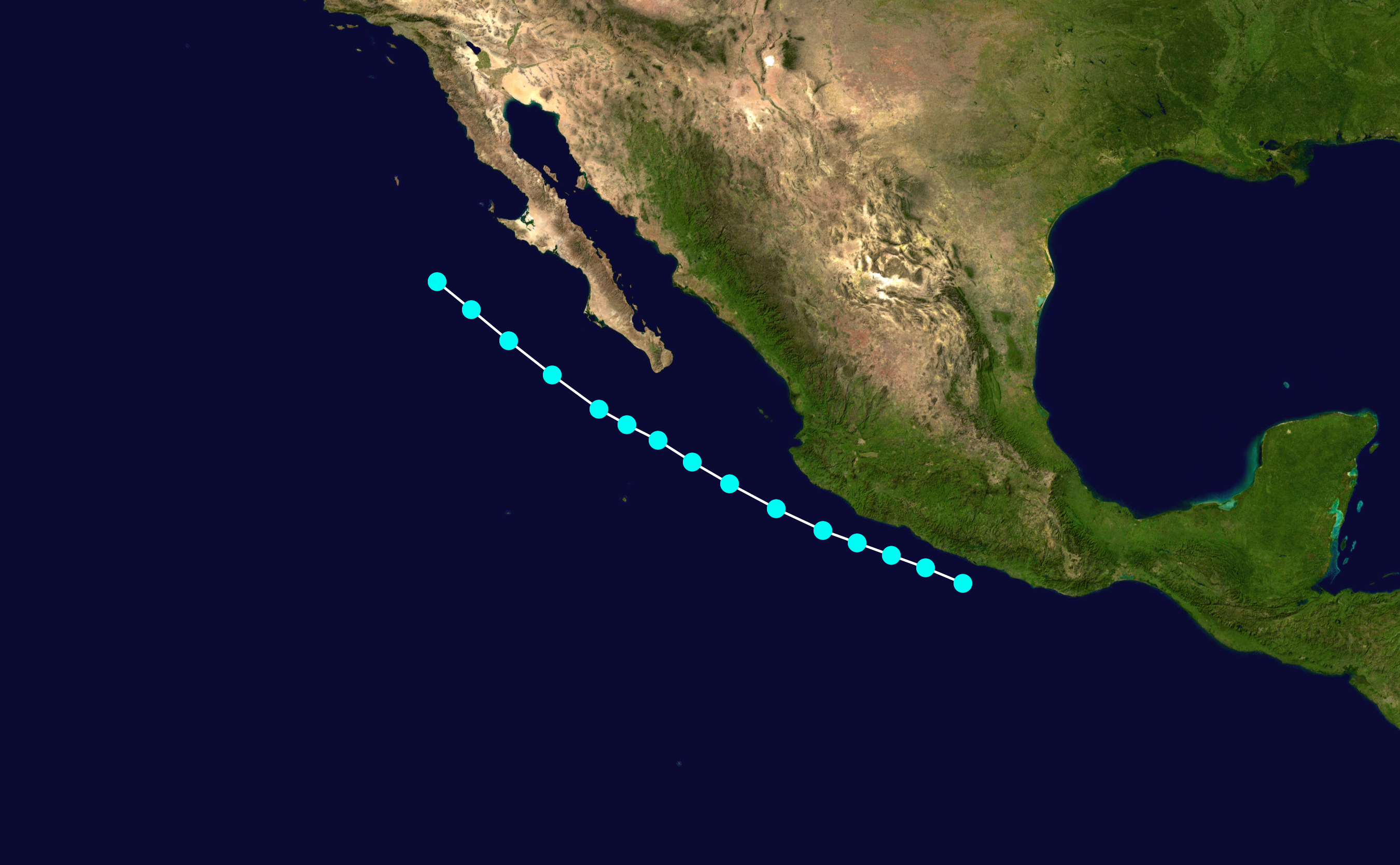
- Duration: July 26 – July 30
- Peak intensity: 50 mph (85 km/h) (1-min); 998 mbar (hPa)

Tropical Storm Five existed from July 26 to July 30. A tropical storm about 140 mi. west of Acapulco, Mexico was located in the 26th. This storm had winds of 45 to 55 kt. from the time if its identification until the 29th. It moved northwestward off the coast of Mexico finally breaking up into an area of squalls near 26N 117W on the 30th. The storm spread moisture and rainfall into southern California, reaching 2 in (51 mm) at Barton Flats. Floods and mudslides covered five cars, inundated a portion of U.S. 66, and entered a few buildings.

=== Tropical Storm Six ===
- Tropical storm (SSHWS)
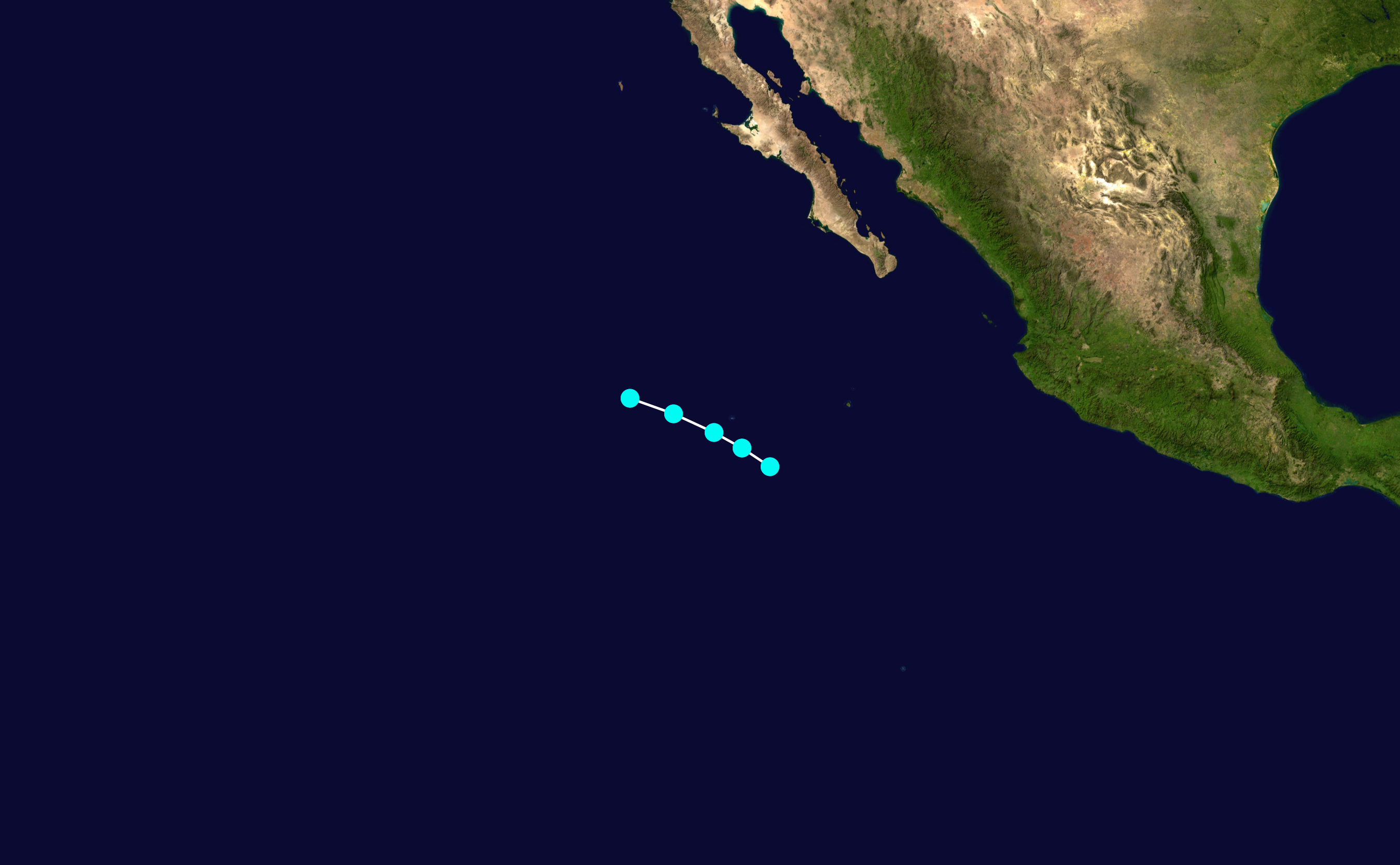
- Duration: July 31 – August 1
- Peak intensity: 50 mph (85 km/h) (1-min); 1004 mbar (hPa)

Tropical Storm Six existed from July 31 to August 1.

=== Tropical Storm Seven ===
- Tropical storm (SSHWS)
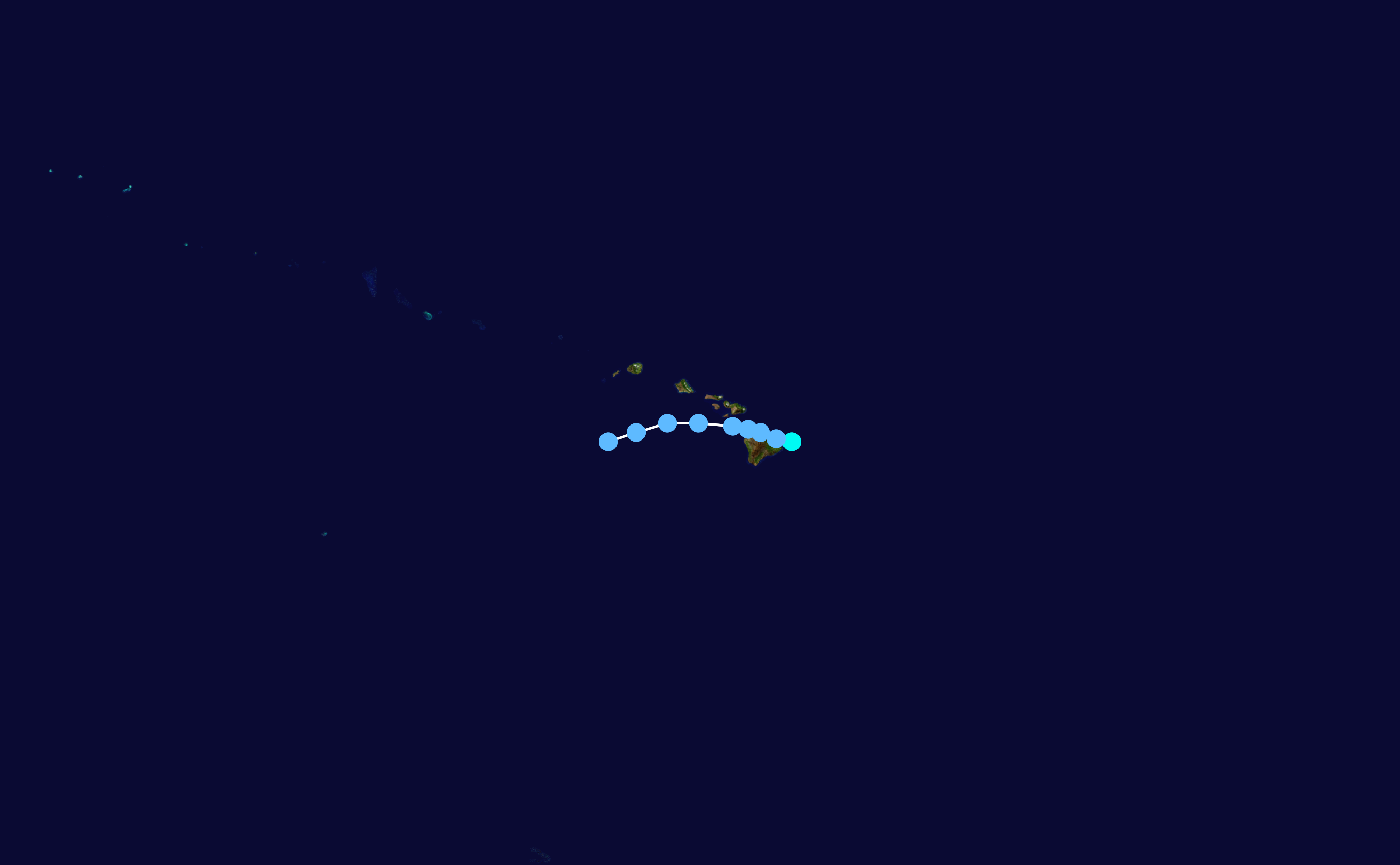
- Duration: August 7 – August 9
- Peak intensity: 50 mph (85 km/h) (1-min);

A tropical storm developed rapidly just east of Hawaii on August 7. It moved westward into Hilo, where its circulation was greatly disrupted. A weakened depression persisted for 2 more days before dissipating. While weak, the storm caused very heavy flooding resulting in $500,000 in damage. A private plane crashed near Hilo Airport on the 7th, killing the pilot and injuring the two passengers.

=== Tropical Storm Eight ===
- Tropical storm (SSHWS)
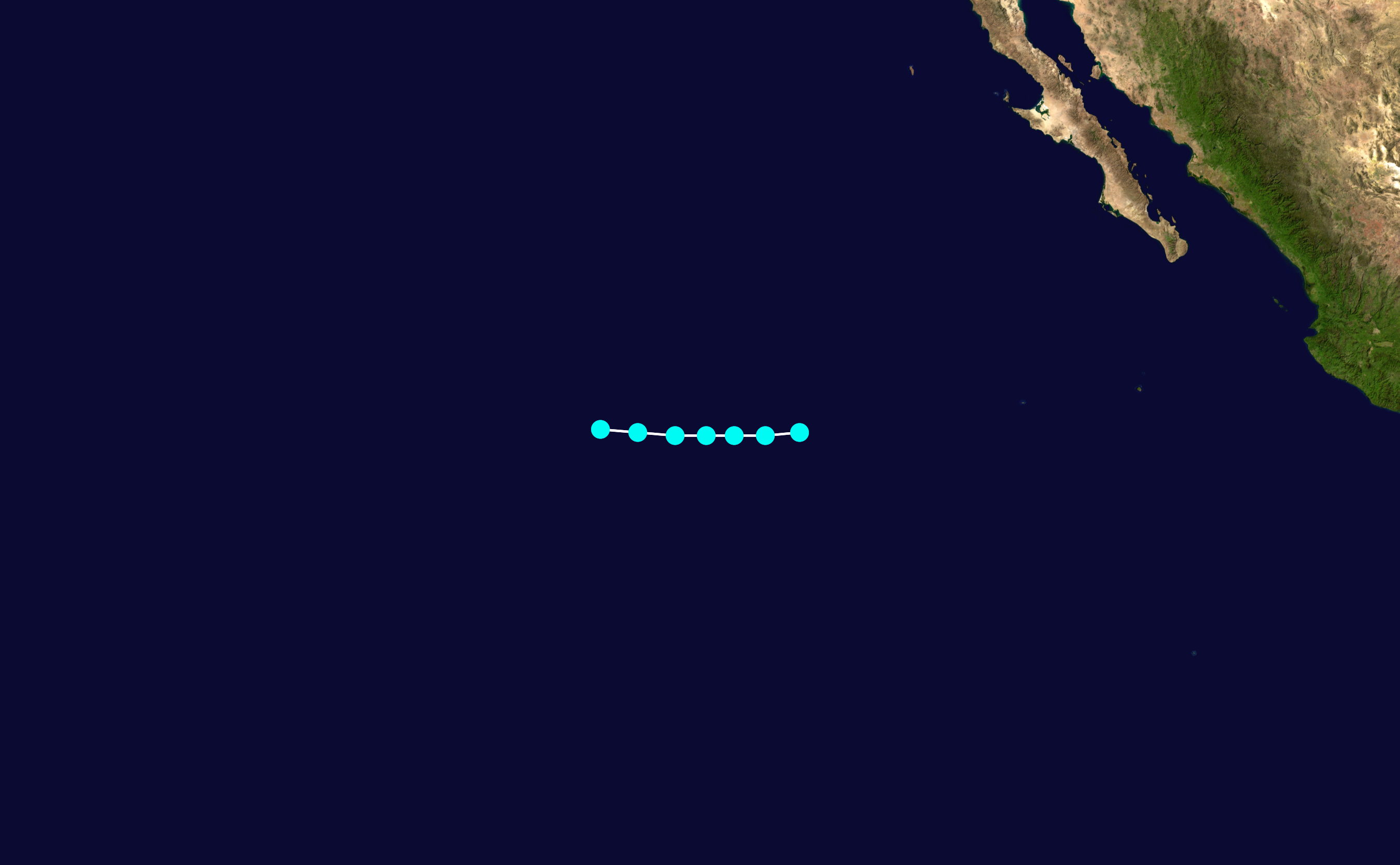
- Duration: August 13 – August 14
- Peak intensity: 50 mph (85 km/h) (1-min); 1006 mbar (hPa)

Tropical Storm Eight existed from August 13 to August 14.

=== Hurricane Nine ===
Hurricane Nine existed from September 6 to September 13.

- Category 2 hurricane (SSHWS)
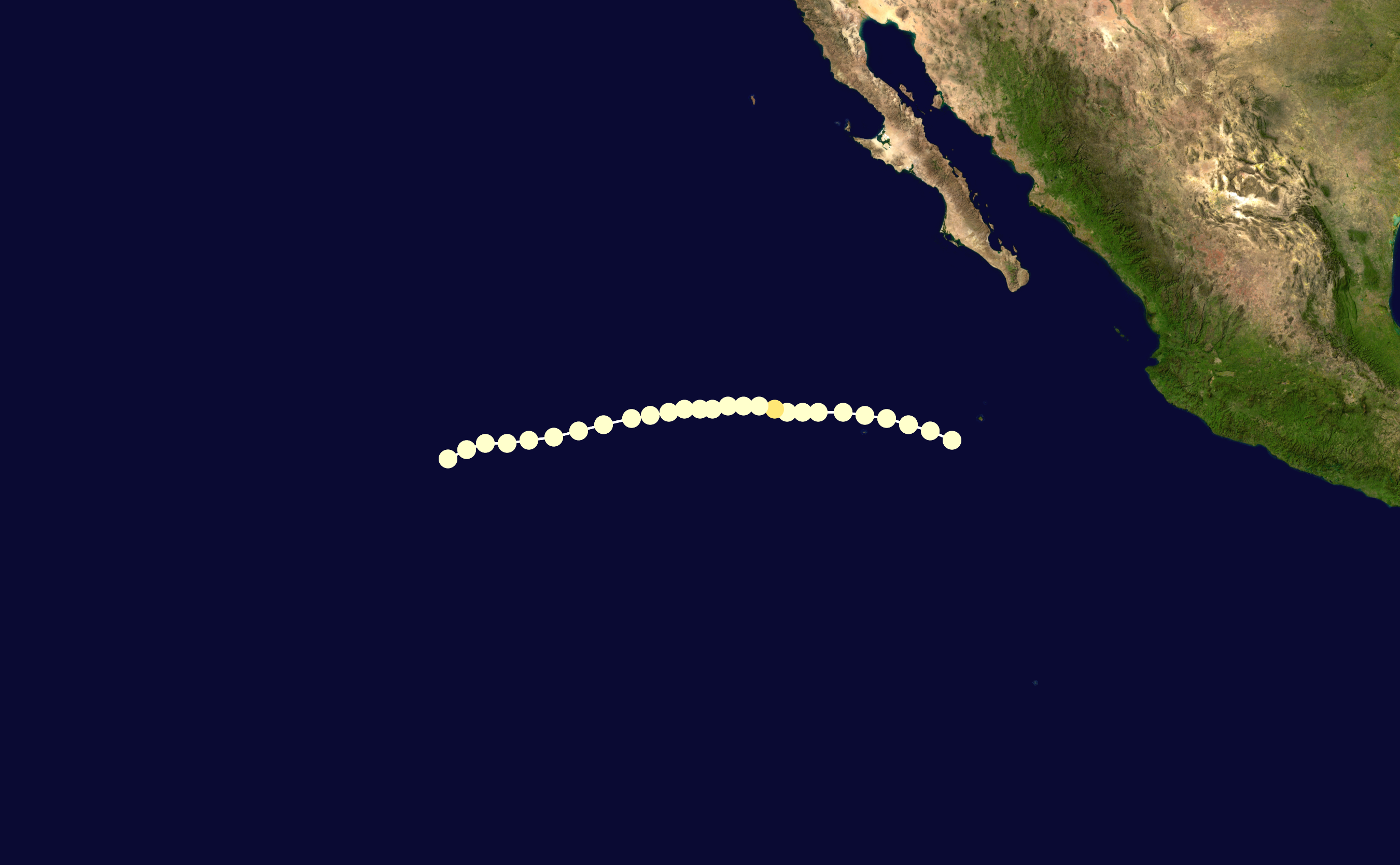
- Duration: September 6 – September 13
- Peak intensity: 105 mph (165 km/h) (1-min); 982 mbar (hPa)

=== Tropical Storm Ten ===
- Tropical storm (SSHWS)
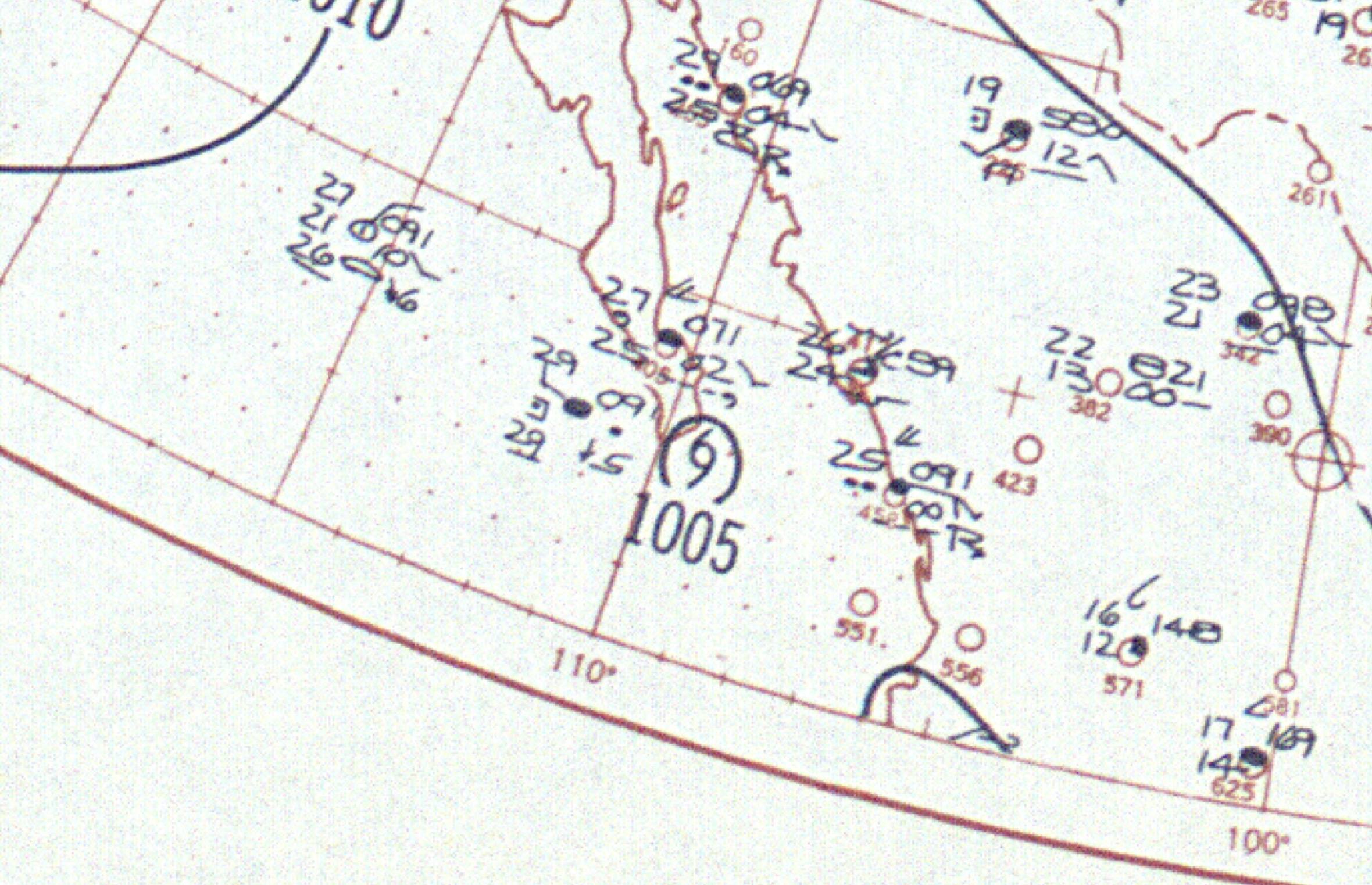
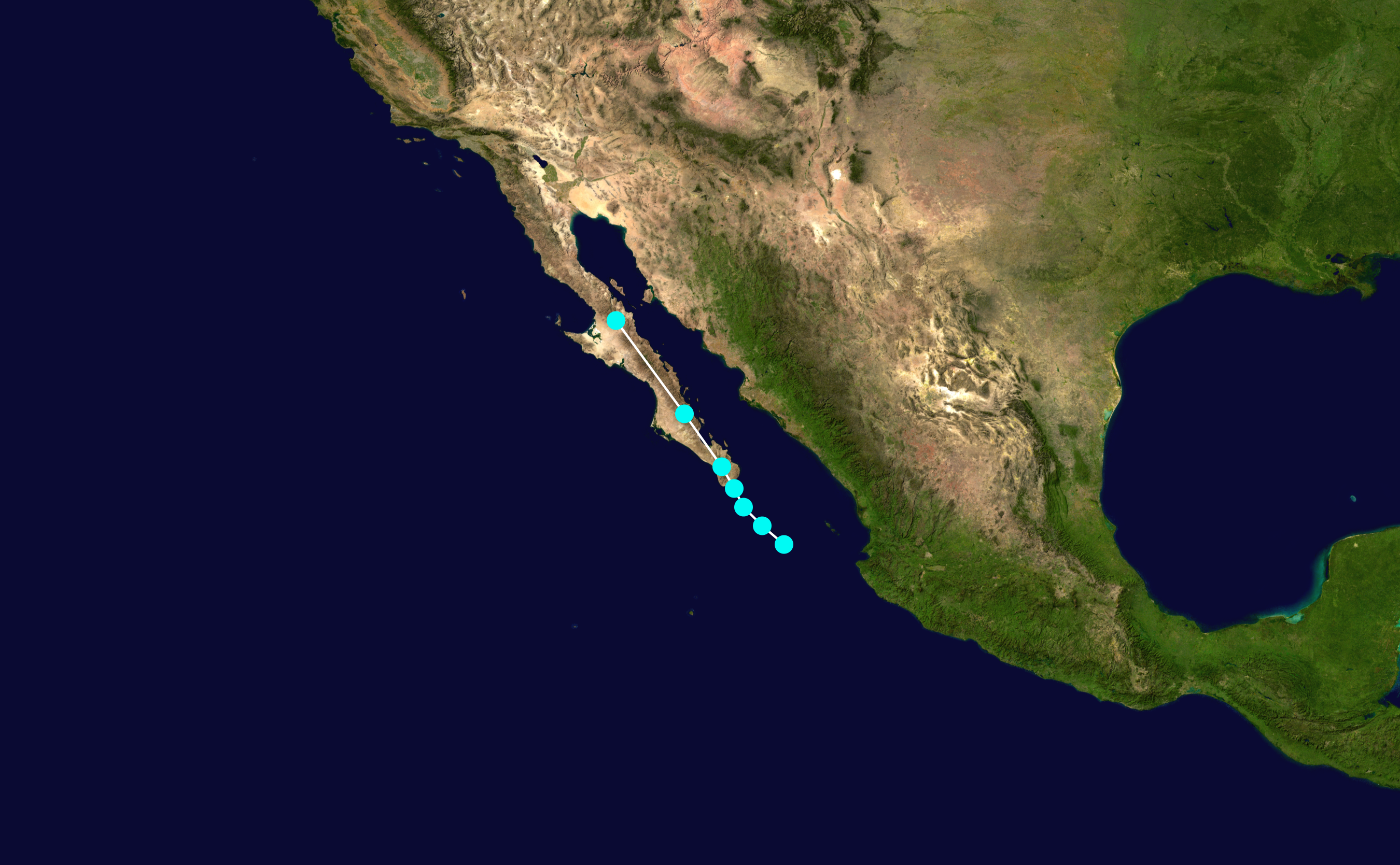
- Duration: September 11 – September 12
- Peak intensity: 50 mph (85 km/h) (1-min); 1003 mbar (hPa)

In mid-September, a tropical storm moved up the Baja California coast.

=== Hurricane June ===
- Category 1 hurricane (SSHWS)
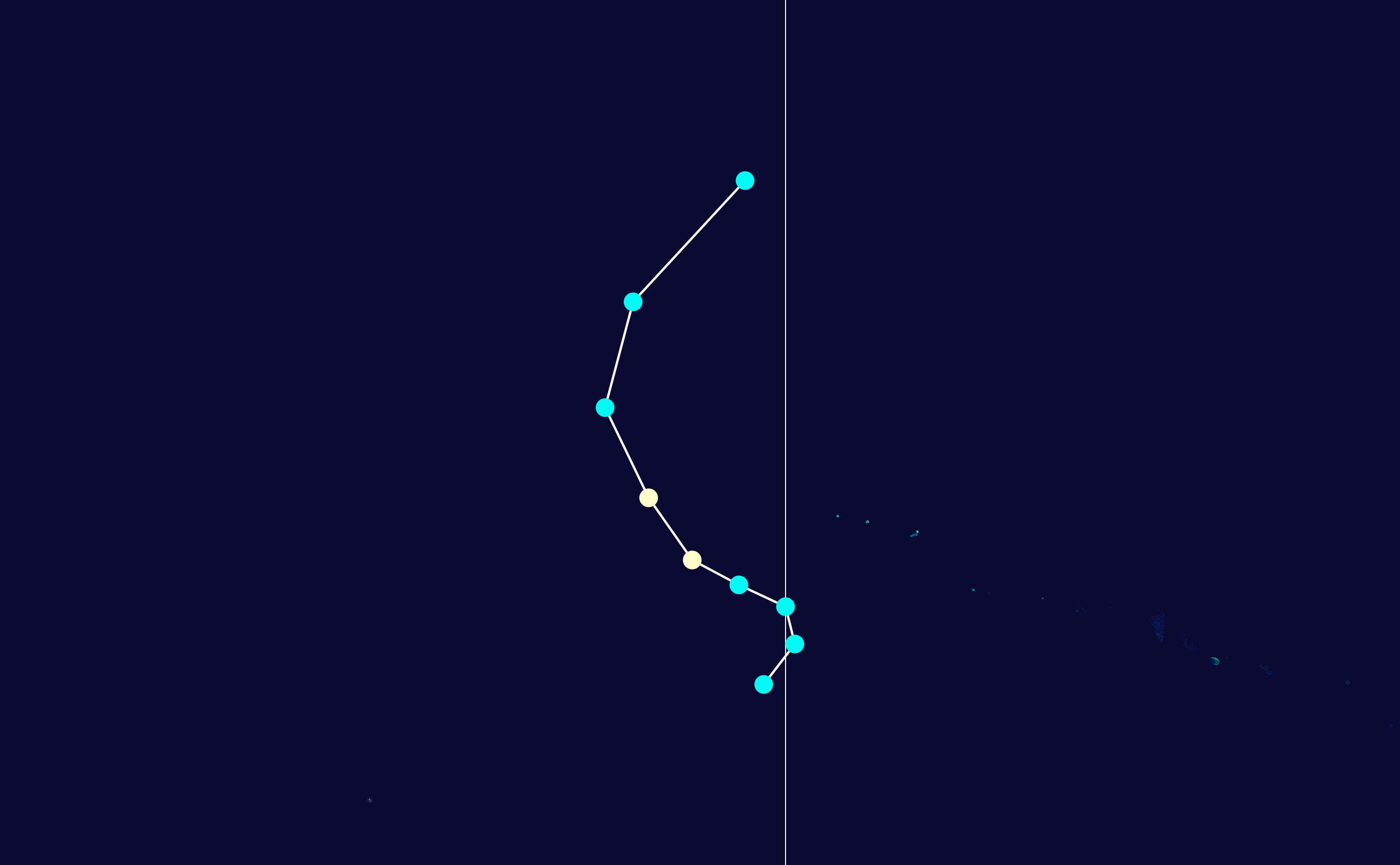
- Duration: September 20 – September 20
- Peak intensity: 75 mph (120 km/h) (1-min); 963 mbar (hPa)

Typhoon June briefly crossed over the date line on September 20.

=== Hurricane Eleven ===
- Category 1 hurricane (SSHWS)
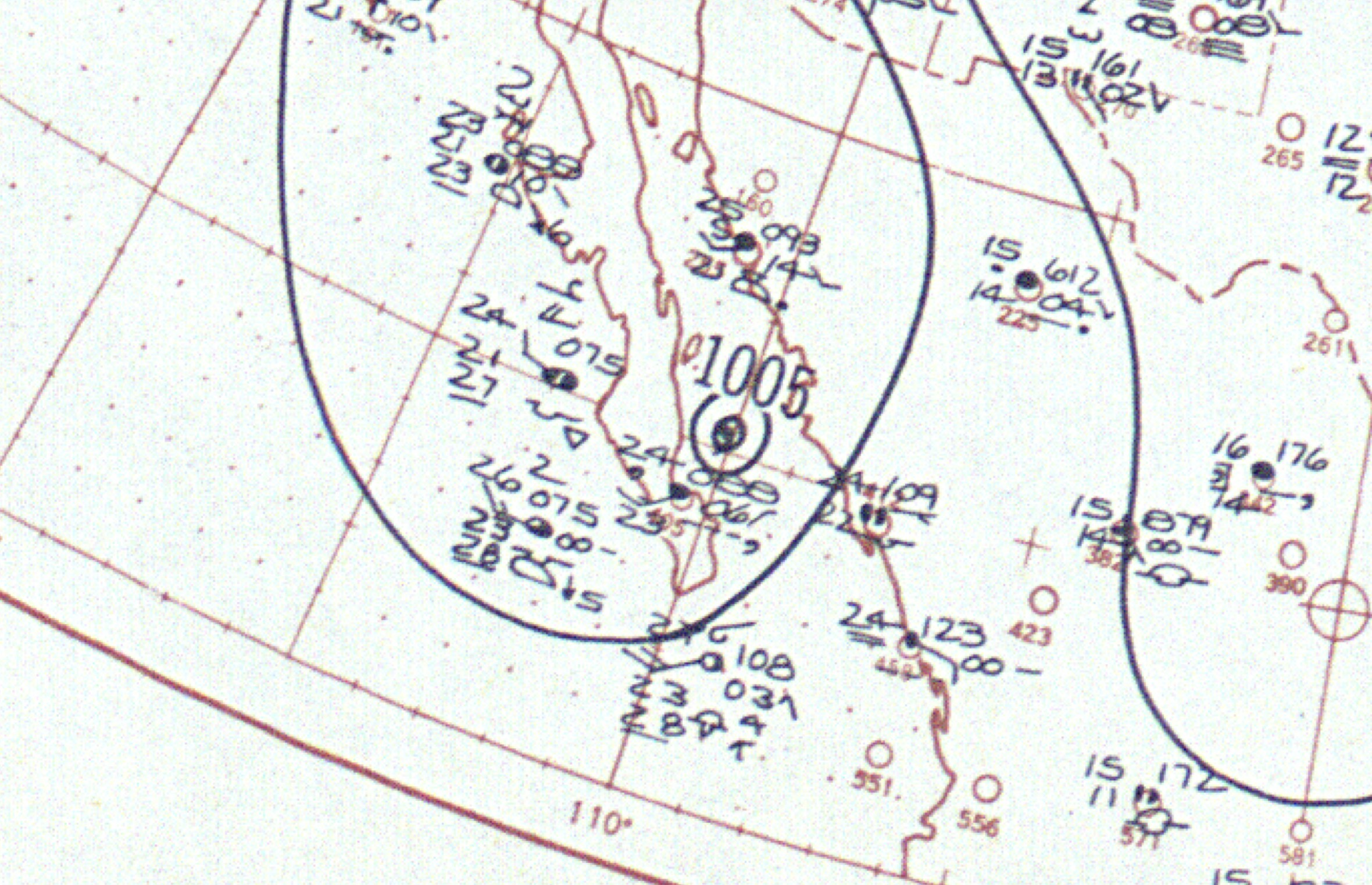
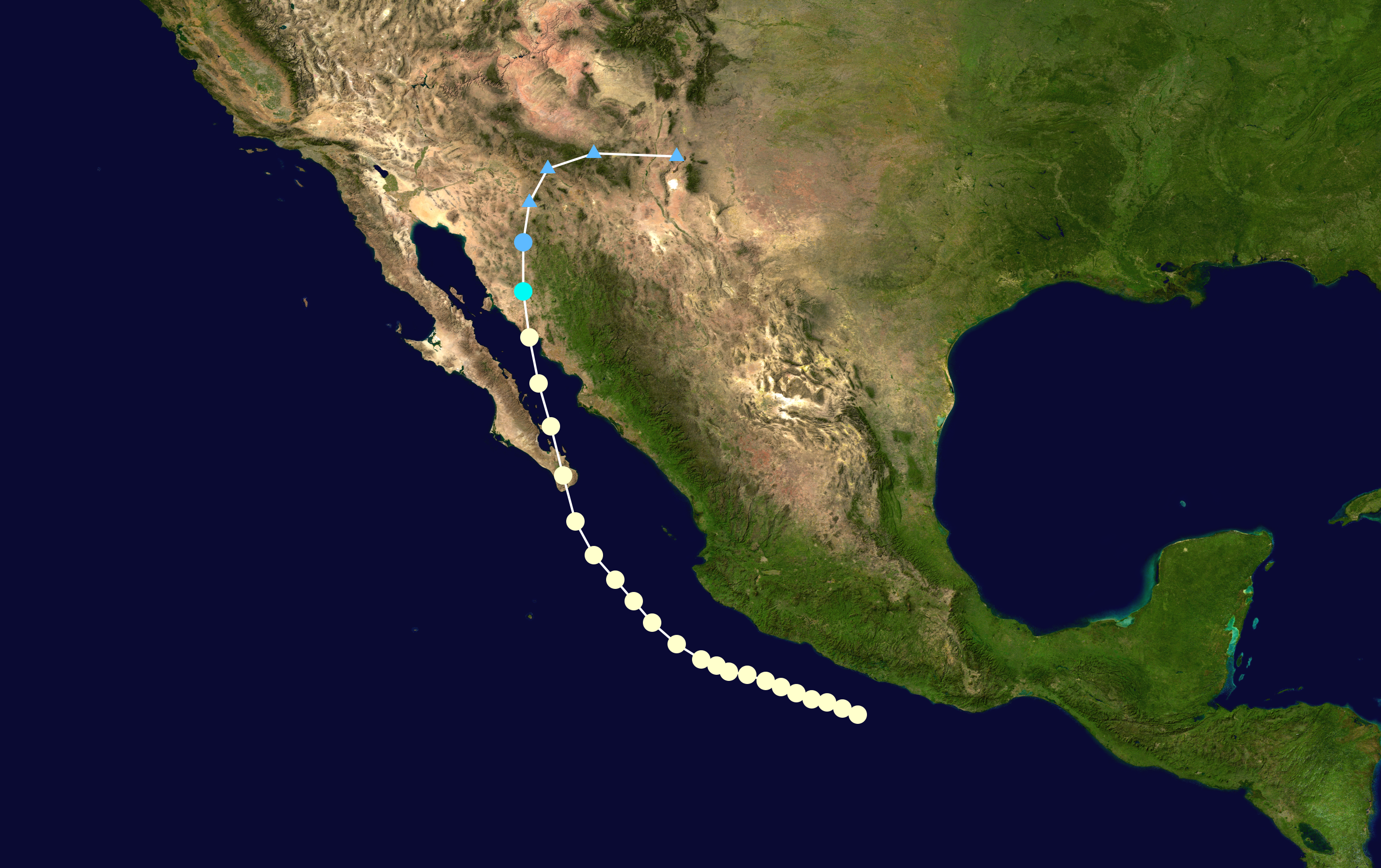
- Duration: September 30 – October 5
- Peak intensity: 85 mph (140 km/h) (1-min); 960 mbar (hPa)

A hurricane moved northward through Baja California and Mexico and dissipated over New Mexico.

The hurricane killed two people, and destroyed at least 30 houses.

=== Tropical Storm Twelve ===
- Tropical storm (SSHWS)
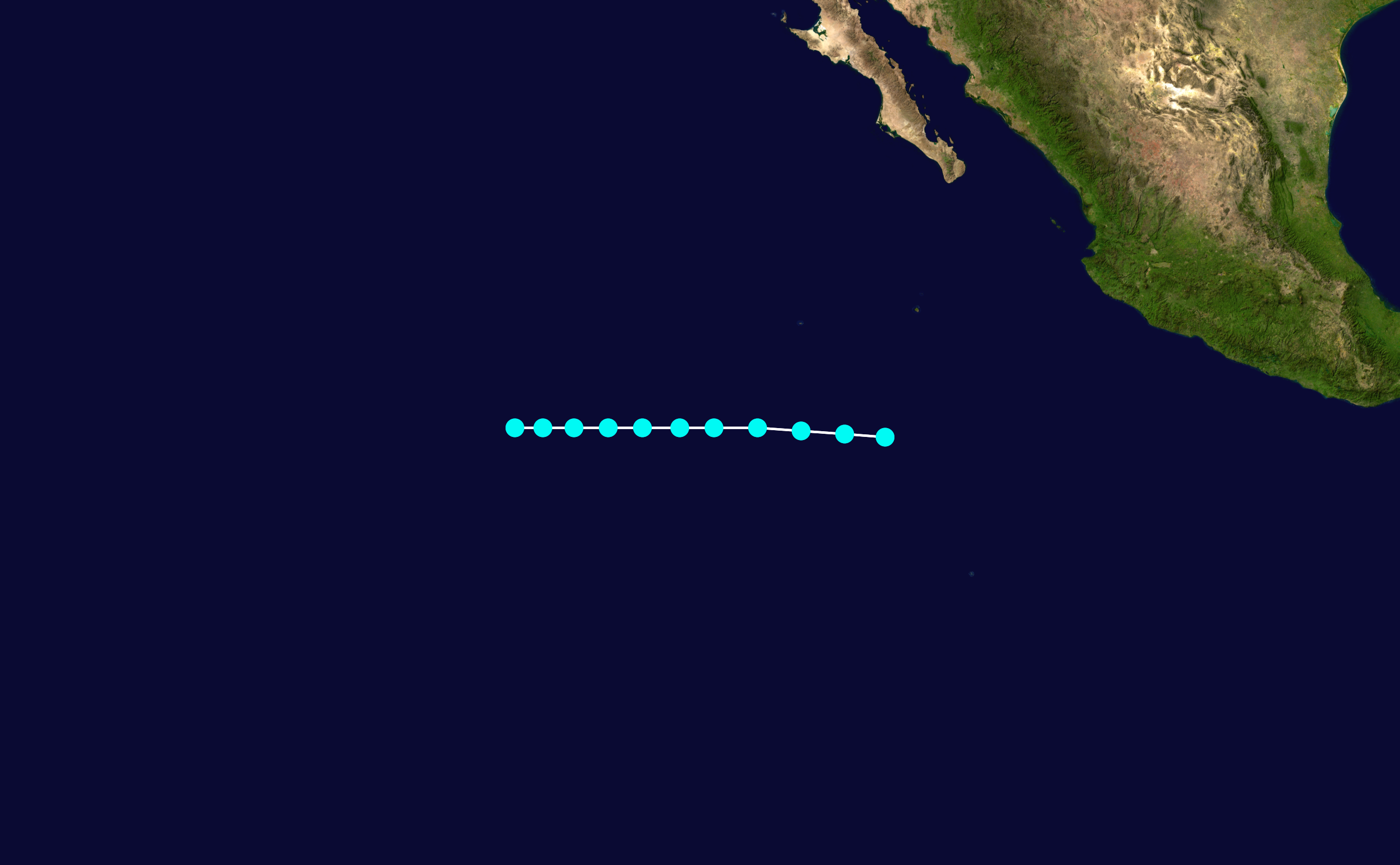
- Duration: October 14 – October 17
- Peak intensity: 50 mph (85 km/h) (1-min); 996 mbar (hPa)

Tropical Storm Twelve existed from October 14 to October 17.

=== Tropical Storm Thirteen ===
- Tropical storm (SSHWS)
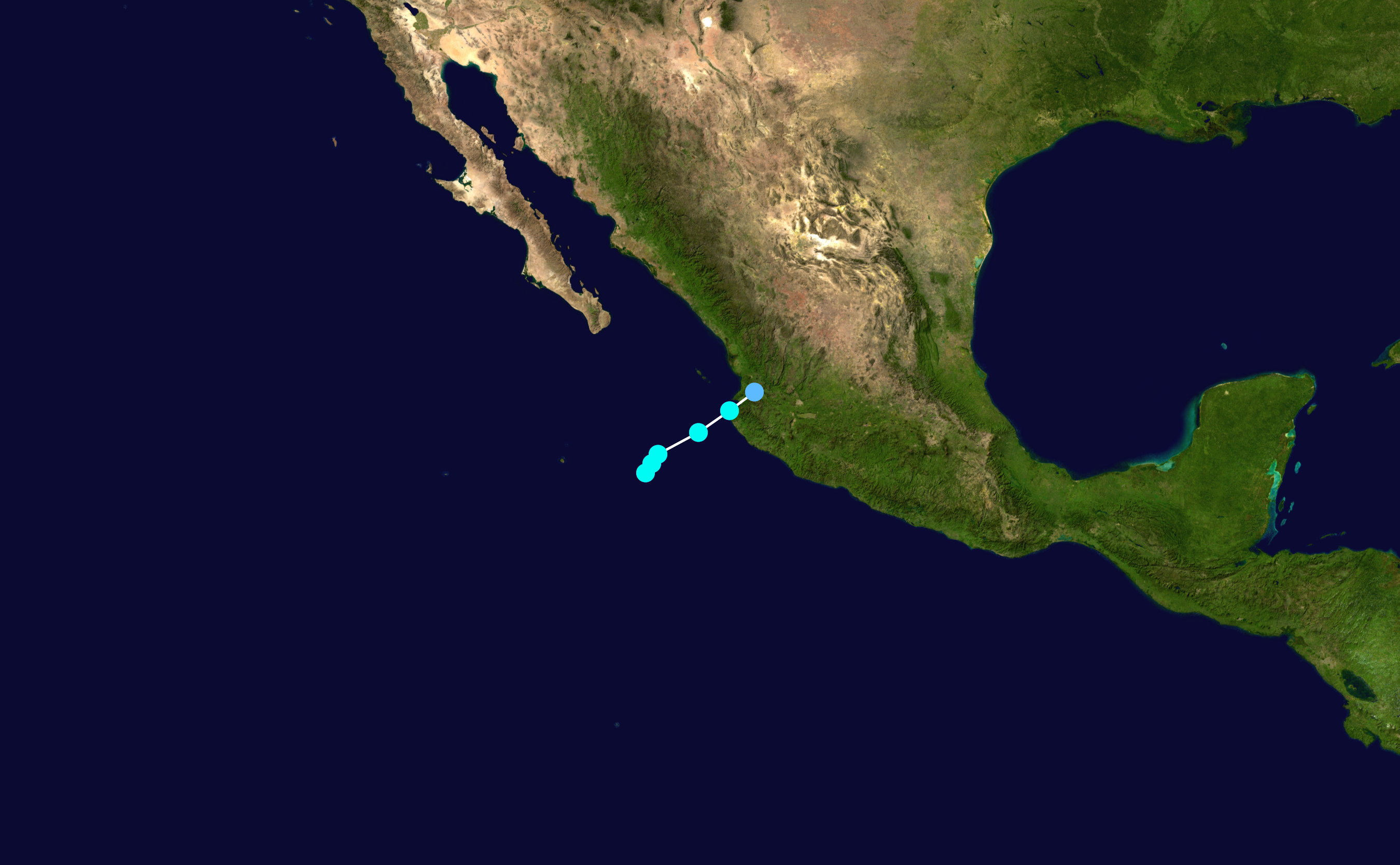
- Duration: October 29 – October 30
- Peak intensity: 50 mph (85 km/h) (1-min); 1003 mbar (hPa)

On October 30 a tropical storm hit southwestern Mexico.

== See also ==
- List of Pacific hurricanes
- 1958 Pacific typhoon season
- 1958 Atlantic hurricane season
- 1950s South-West Indian Ocean cyclone seasons
- 1950s Australian region cyclone seasons
- 1950s South Pacific cyclone seasons
