= Hurricane Eugene (1987) =

Category 2 Pacific hurricane in 1987

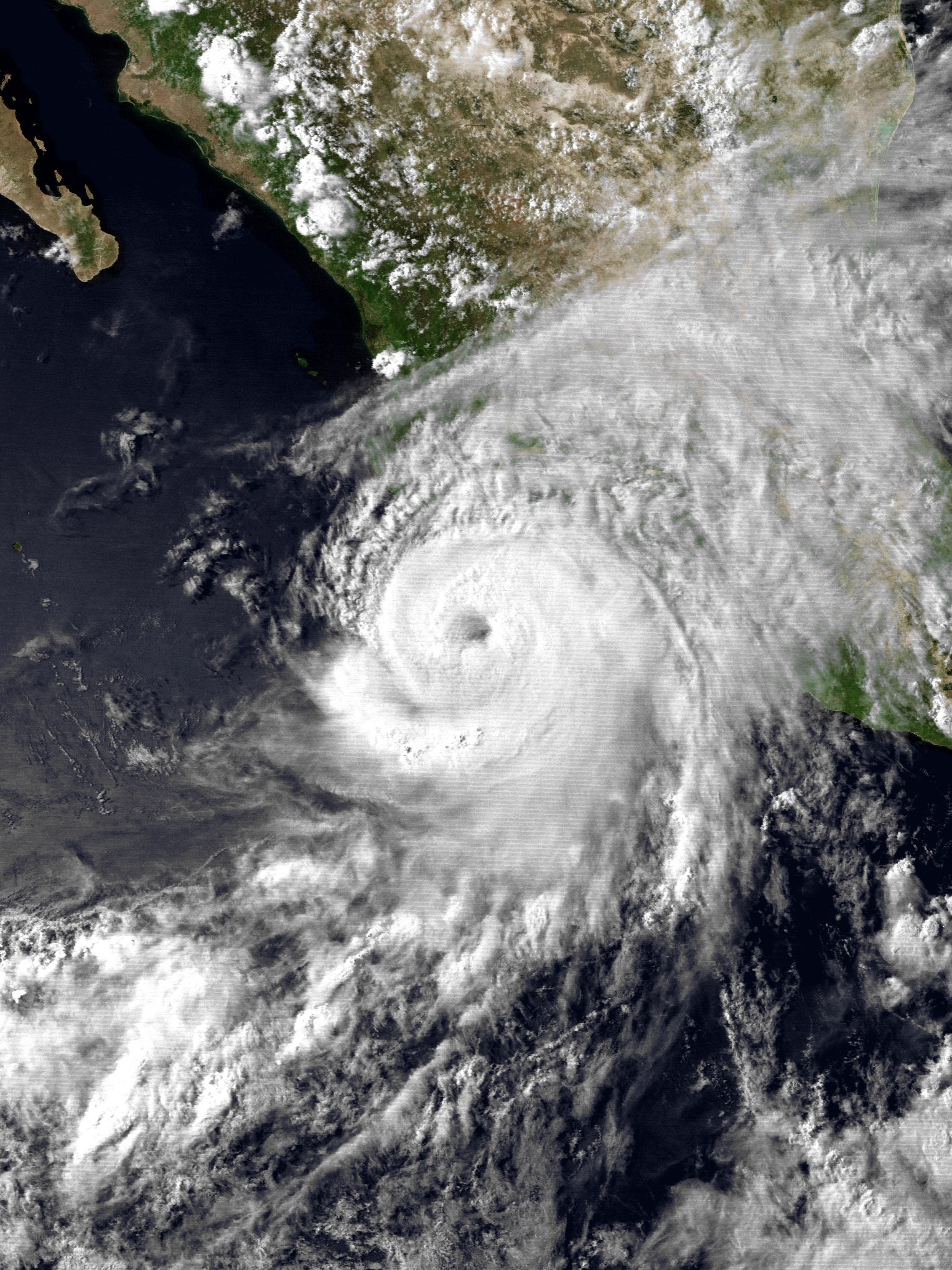
- Hurricane Eugene near peak intensity and approaching the west coast of Mexico on July 24

Meteorological history
- Formed: July 22, 1987
- Dissipated: July 26, 1987

Category 2 hurricane
- 1-minute sustained (SSHWS/NWS)
- Highest winds: 100 mph (155 km/h)

Overall effects
- Fatalities: 3 total
- Damage: $142 million (1987 USD)
- Areas affected: Western Mexico
- IBTrACS
- Part of the 1987 Pacific hurricane season

Hurricane Eugene was the only tropical cyclone to make landfall in Mexico during the 1987 Pacific hurricane season. The eighth tropical cyclone, fifth named storm, and first hurricane of the season, Eugene developed on July 22 from a tropical disturbance centered well offshore of Mexico. Later that day, the system intensified into a tropical storm while moving northwestward. Eugene reached hurricane status on July 24; it briefly peaked as a Category 2 hurricane the next day. Hurricane Eugene weakened back to a Category 1 hurricane; subsequently, the hurricane made landfall near Manzanillo. Shortly after landfall, Eugene rapidly weakened inland, and was only a tropical storm when it re-emerged into open water, where it quickly dissipated. Throughout southwestern Mexico, the storm produced high winds, especially in the southwestern portion of the country. The hurricane deluged the southwest Mexican coastline, resulting in the highest rainfall totals from a tropical cyclone in five Mexican states. Over 5,000 people were left homeless, including 60 in Manzanillo. The city's airport control tower was also damaged, requiring closure. Elsewhere, 200 to 300 houses were destroyed in Colima. In all, Eugene injured 18 people, and caused three fatalities and $142.12 million (1987 USD) in damage.

== Meteorological history ==
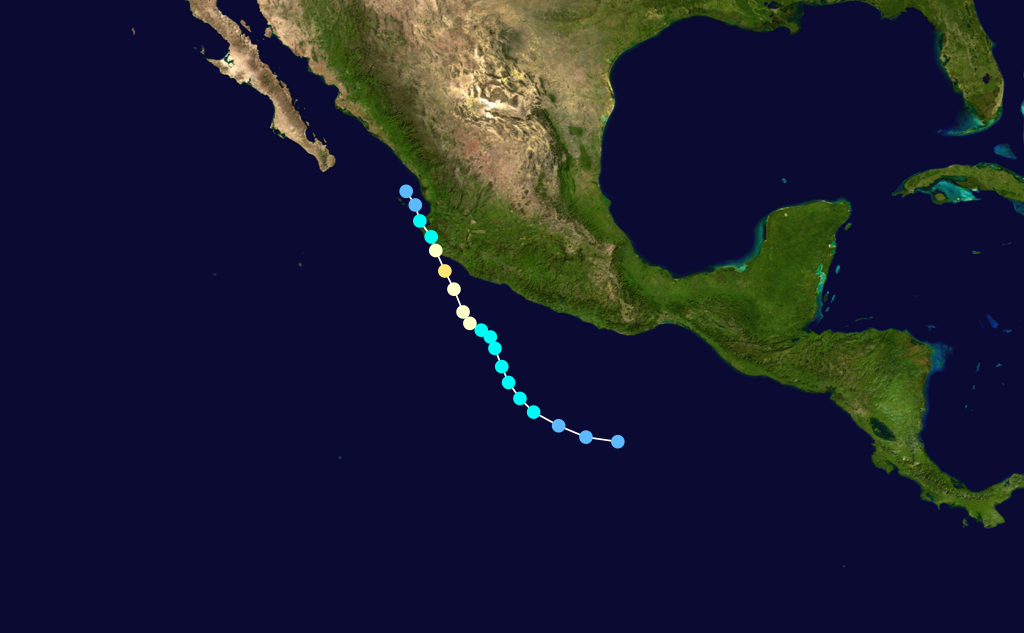
Map plotting the storm's track and intensity, according to the Saffir–Simpson scale Map key Saffir–Simpson scale Tropical depression (≤38 mph, ≤62 km/h) Tropical storm (39–73 mph, 63–118 km/h) Category 1 (74–95 mph, 119–153 km/h) Category 2 (96–110 mph, 154–177 km/h) Category 3 (111–129 mph, 178–208 km/h) Category 4 (130–156 mph, 209–251 km/h) Category 5 (≥157 mph, ≥252 km/h) Unknown Storm type Tropical cyclone Subtropical cyclone Extratropical cyclone, remnant low, tropical disturbance, or monsoon depression

Hurricane Eugene originated from a tropical disturbance that formed in the southwest Caribbean Sea on July 18. Over the next two days, the wave moved across Central America and on July 20, it was located off the coast of Nicaragua. Over the next few days, the system was steered westward due to easterly flow. By 0000 UTC July 22, the Eastern Pacific Hurricane Center had classified the system as a tropical depression while centered 745 mi (1,200 km) south of Manzanillo. Subsequently, the depression slowly began curving to the north-northwest, towards a stationary inverted trough over central Mexico. That day, the depression intensified into Tropical Storm Eugene. The storm slowed down on July 24, and located on the southwest side of an upper-level low, the system turned northwestward. Eugene was upgraded into a hurricane later that day, the first of the season. Further intensification occurred, and Eugene attained its peak intensity of 100 mph (160 km/h) the next day.

Shortly after its peak, the hurricane began to interact with land. The hurricane weakened to a Category 1 hurricane on the Saffir-Simpson Hurricane Scale later that day. At 1200 UTC on July 25, Eugene made landfall near Manzanillo with winds of 90 mph (145 km/h), making Hurricane Eugene the only tropical system to move ashore during the season, though one hurricane and one tropical storm came close to land in September and October respectively. Because of the topography of Mexico, the storm weakened rapidly, and Eugene was downgraded to a tropical storm six hours after landfall. After briefly moving inland, Eugene emerged into the southern Gulf of California. However, re-intensification did not occur; instead, Eugene continued weakening due to its close proximity to land. The weakening system was downgraded to a tropical depression early on July 26, and Eugene dissipated at 1200 UTC that day.

== Preparations and impact ==
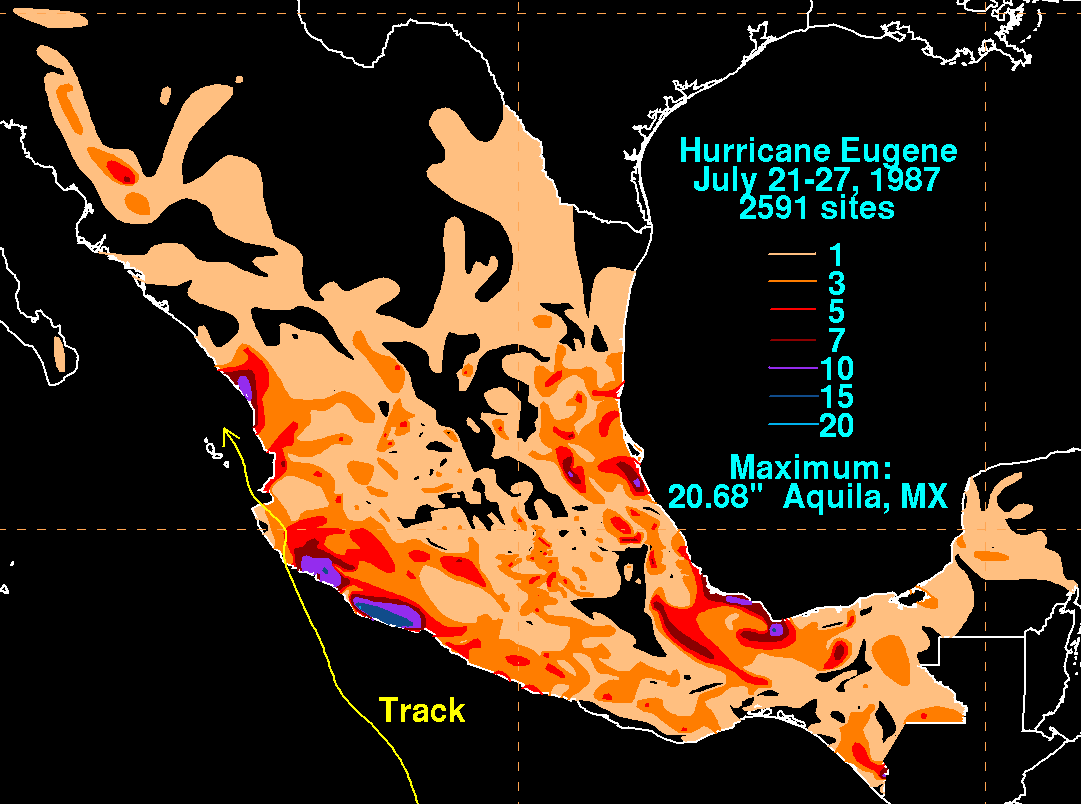
Rainfall totals from Hurricane Eugene in Mexico

When the storm first posed a threat to Mexico on July 24, several ports such as the port of Zihuatanejo and Manzanillo. In Acapulco, navigation classes were suspended. The Mexican navy was put on alert for a total distance of 945 mi (1,520 km) spanning from Acapulco to Guaymas. The Servicio Meteorologico Nacional issued navigation warnings for three coastal states. Hurricane Eugene caused extremely heavy rains in coastal parts of Mexico. Rainfall peaked at 20.68 in (525 mm) in Aqulia. The cyclone is responsible for the highest tropical cyclone rainfall in the Mexican states of Aguascalientes, Michoacán, Querétaro, Tlaxcala, and Zacatecas. Waves of 15 ft (4.6 m) were also reported.

Hurricane Eugene brought widespread flooding, heavy rain, and high winds to Colima, which leveled homes and palm trees. Numerous poorly built homes lost their roofs, though well-built structures did not sustain any significant damage. In Puerto Vallarta, Hurricane Eugene was responsible for extensive damage to homes and for knocking out power to most of the city, which, along with surrounding areas, was also flooded with 1.5 ft (0.46 m) of water. In Manzanillo, the storm knocked down trees and beach huts and power was knocked out for most of the city. The Manzanillo Airport was closed for a few days after the airport's control tower was damaged. A highway from Manzanillo to Colima was closed to thru traffic because of the storm. Throughout the state of Colima, crop damage was severe and 200-300 homes were destroyed statewide. Several hundred miles further south, in Tecoman and Pueblo Capos, many homes and public buildings received damage. In Michoacán, the Grande River spilled over its banks, flooding five villages and leaving at least 10,000 people without transportation or communication services. Several landslides were reported along a number of main highways, making travel in the area difficult. Overall, crop damage in the state was severe.

The hurricane destroyed about 15 sq. mi (39 km^{2}) of fruit crop. A total of 18 people were injured during the storm. The storm destroyed 3,107 acres of mango trees and 5,662 acres of bananas were destroyed, with the worst crop damage occurring in Jalisco. Moreover, 540 acres of cocoa, 580 acres of papaya, and at least 382 acres of lemon trees were also destroyed by Eugene. Due to a combination of Eugene and Hurricane Greg, the region registered rainfall amounts four times the average. In addition, three people were killed; two of the deaths occurred in Michoacán. One man died in Venustiano Carrazano when a palm tree was blown over. Another man perished in Manzanillo when he was struck by a fallen palm tree. Over 5,000 people were left homeless (mostly from poor and rural areas), including 60 people in Manzanillo. Total crop damage amounted to $142 million (1987 USD); fruit crop damage alone amounted to more than $2.6 million (1987 USD). Damage to eight beach houses totaled to $120,000.

== Aftermath ==
During the aftermath of the storm, the navy, army, and local government devised a cleanup plan. Three hundred government employees (with guidance of the military) worked to clear debris. They quickly restored water and power service, and within a few days streets had been cleaned for most of the impacted area. Authorities in Manzanillo asked for medicine, clothing and food from nearby areas while the red cross treated the injured. Many of the displaced were evacuated to government offices. Within a few days after the storm, the ports of Manzanillo, Acapulco, Zihuatanejo and Lazaro Cardenas were reopened. The remnants of the storm later brought rain to the Rocky Mountains and the Southwestern United States. Eugene is one of three known July Pacific hurricane strikes, defined as when hurricane-force winds are estimated to have occurred over land. The other two hurricanes were Hurricane Calvin in 1993 and a hurricane that struck Baja California Sur in 1954.

== See also ==
- Other storms of the same name
- List of Pacific hurricanes
- Hurricane Calvin (1993) – another rare landfalling July hurricane
