= Hurricane Calvin (1993) =

Category 2 Pacific hurricane in 1993

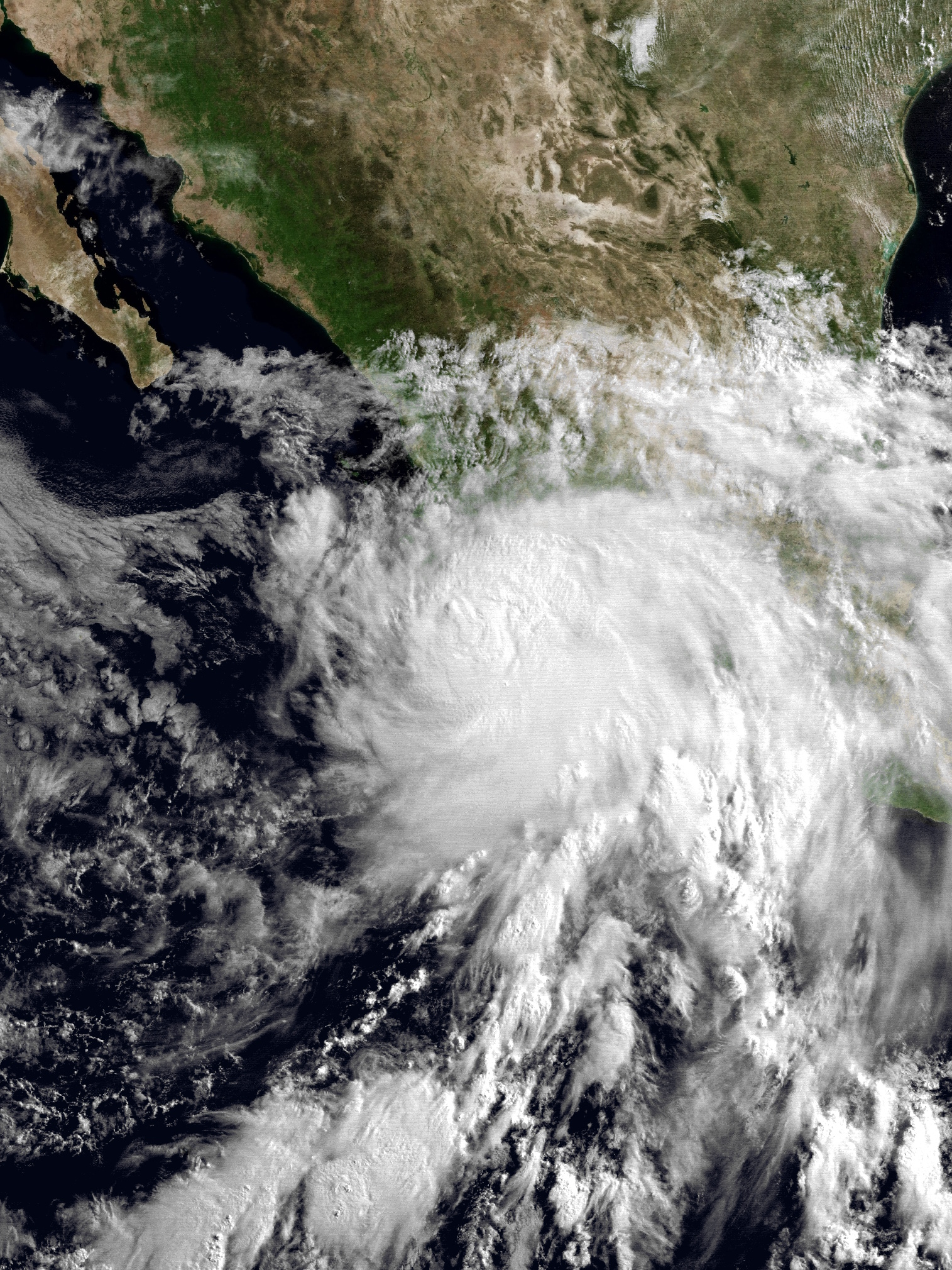
- Calvin at peak intensity off the southern coast of Mexico on July 7

Meteorological history
- Formed: July 4, 1993
- Dissipated: July 9, 1993

Category 2 hurricane
- 1-minute sustained (SSHWS/NWS)
- Highest winds: 110 mph (175 km/h)
- Lowest pressure: 966 mbar (hPa); 28.53 inHg

Overall effects
- Fatalities: 37
- Damage: $32 million (1993 USD)
- Areas affected: Southwestern Mexico, Baja California Sur
- IBTrACS
- Part of the 1993 Pacific hurricane season

Hurricane Calvin was one of three Pacific hurricanes on record to make landfall along the Mexican coast during the month of July. The fourth tropical cyclone, third named storm, and second hurricane of the 1993 Pacific hurricane season, Calvin developed from an area of convection to the south of Mexico on July 4. The following day, the system intensified into a tropical storm, which was named Calvin. Continued strengthening ensued as Calvin curved from its initial westward track northward, and was upgraded to a hurricane on July 6. Calvin eventually turned northwest, and became a Category 2 hurricane on the Saffir–Simpson hurricane wind scale (SSHWS). By July 7, Hurricane Calvin made landfall near Manzanillo at peak strength. Calvin rapidly weakened after landfall, and was a tropical storm when it reemerged into the Pacific Ocean on early on July 8. Despite this, the hurricane did not reintensify, and continued to weaken as it headed rapidly northwestward. As Calvin made a second Mexican landfall near the southern tip of Baja California peninsula late on July 8, it weakened to a tropical depression. Early on July 9, the depression dissipated shortly after entering the Pacific Ocean for a third time.

Calvin was only the third July hurricane on record to make landfall on the west coast of Mexico. Throughout the nation of Mexico, Calvin dropped heavy rainfall, especially in the southwestern portion of the country. Heavy rainfall produced flooding, which, in turn, caused mudslides. In the wake of Calvin, 37 fatalities were reported. Most of the casualties were due to flooding or car accidents. In the state of Michoacán, 700 homes were destroyed. In addition, a 15-foot (4.6 m) storm surge was reported. Many boats and shoreline structures from Acapulco to Manzanillo were damaged. Heavy seas near Lázaro Cárdenas in western Mexico caused a ship, which contained sulfuric acid, to leak. The cleanup effort took one month to complete. In all, 30,000 people were displaced by the storm. Overall, Calvin caused $32 million (1993 US$) in damage.

== Background ==
A trough steered Calvin northward to hit Mexico as a hurricane in the month of July, making Calvin one of only three Pacific hurricanes to strike the nation since HURDAT started keeping records during the 1949 Pacific hurricane season. The other ones were Hurricane Eugene in 1987 and the third storm in 1954.

== Meteorological history ==
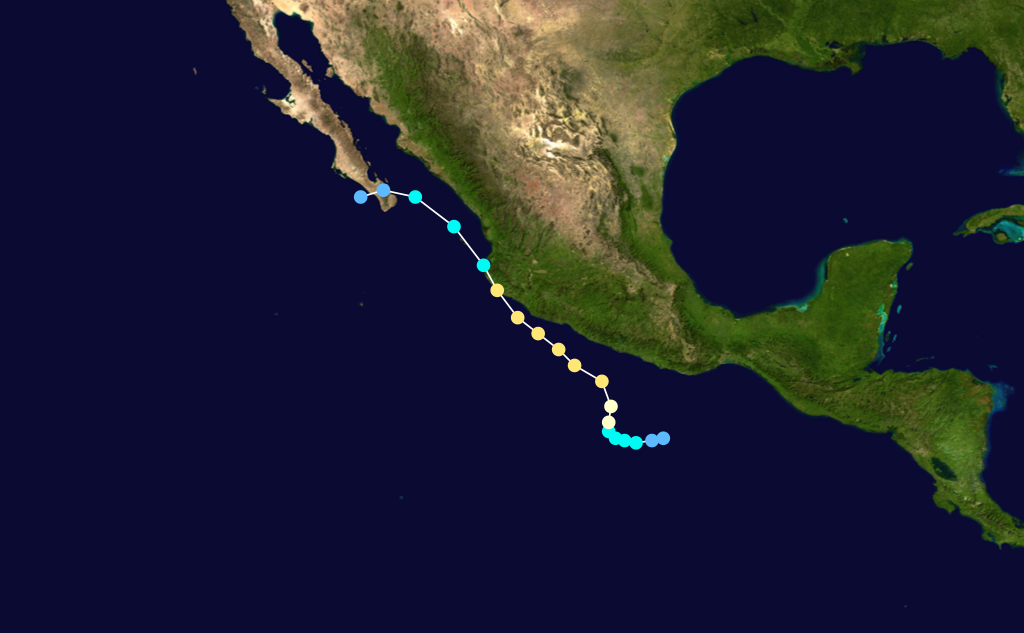
Map plotting the storm's track and intensity, according to the Saffir–Simpson scale Map key Saffir–Simpson scale Tropical depression (≤38 mph, ≤62 km/h) Tropical storm (39–73 mph, 63–118 km/h) Category 1 (74–95 mph, 119–153 km/h) Category 2 (96–110 mph, 154–177 km/h) Category 3 (111–129 mph, 178–208 km/h) Category 4 (130–156 mph, 209–251 km/h) Category 5 (≥157 mph, ≥252 km/h) Unknown Storm type Tropical cyclone Subtropical cyclone Extratropical cyclone, remnant low, tropical disturbance, or monsoon depression

Hurricane Calvin originated from an area of disturbed weather, characterized with scattered deep convection, that developed south of the Gulf of Tehuantepec on the second day of July. Despite the lack of concentrated convection, the system was classified using the Dvorak technique, a tool used to measure a tropical cyclone's intensity. However, during the morning hours of July 4, banding features formed on the southern semicircle of the disturbance, and it is estimated that the system attained tropical depression status at 1200 UTC while centered approximately 315 mi (505 km) southeast of Acapulco. Initially, the storm was expected to stay offshore and attain winds of 70 mph (115 km/h). Intensifying within a favorable atmospheric environment, the depression attained tropical storm status at 0000 UTC on July 5, receiving the name Calvin.

A period of rapid intensification ensued shortly thereafter, and banding-type eye formed in association with Calvin later that day. By July 5, the National Hurricane Center (NHC) was predicting winds of 80 mph (130 km/h). Later that day, the NHC reported winds of 65 mph (105 km/h). Continuing to intensify, the system was upgraded to a hurricane at 0000 UTC on July 6 while becoming the second hurricane of the season, though operationally, it was believed to have become a hurricane three hours earlier. Upon becoming a hurricane, the NHC revised their forecast and was now expecting Calvin to become a Category 3 hurricane on the SSHWS. Around this time, Hurricane Calvin was embedded within the northeastern portion of a large, monsoon-like deep-layer-mean, which stretched from the Intertropical Convergence Zone to the southwest Mexican coastline. Furthermore, Calvin was a fairly large cyclone as surface winds of 35 mph (55 km/h) were reported over 200 mi (320 km) from the storm's center.

During the late morning hours of July 6, Calvin briefly slowed down before quickly accelerating to the northwest, bringing Calvin's gale-force winds 90 mi (140 km) south-southwest of Acapulco. Later that day, the NHC upgraded Calvin into a Category 2 hurricane. At 1200 UTC on July 7, Calvin reached its peak intensity of 100 mph (160 km/h) and a minimum barometric pressure of 966 mbar (28.5 inHg). Shortly thereafter, Calvin made landfall, approximately 40 mi (65 km) west-northwest of Manzanillo. The storm quickly weakened over land, and by the evening, it had weakened into a tropical storm. After weakening greatly due to land interaction with the mountainous terrain of Mexico, Calvin reentered the Pacific at 0000 UTC on July 8. Although initially expected to turn west, this did not occur. Instead, Calvin continued northwest, accelerating while emerging into the Gulf of California. Calvin weakened to a tropical depression late on July 8 as it made a second landfall along the extreme southern Baja California peninsula. After crossing the coast, Tropical Depression Calvin dissipated the next day atop of cold sea surface temperatures.

== Preparations ==
Prior to making landfall, a tropical storm warning and hurricane watch was issued for a portion of the Mexican coast on July 6. Six hours later, a hurricane warning was issued. By July 8, all hurricane warnings were discontinued. Six hours later, all hurricane watches were dropped. By 1800 UTC that day, all watches and warnings were dropped. In addition to the watches and warnings, flash floods and mudslides to occur. In Acapulco, hundreds of police and emergency workers were on stand by in advance of the storm. Meanwhile, the city's airport and ports were closed. Further south, in Oaxaca, the ports of Puerto Escondido, Puerto Ángel, Bahias de Huatulco, and Salina Cruz were closed. As a precautionary measure, the port of Zihuatanejo was also closed. In all, many sea ports were closed and airplane flights were canceled leaving many vacationers stranded. Multiple hotels were closed in the cities of Acapulco, Puerto Angel, and Huatulco. While weakening, the storm also threatened ports such as Mazatlán along the Gulf of California coast.

== Impact ==
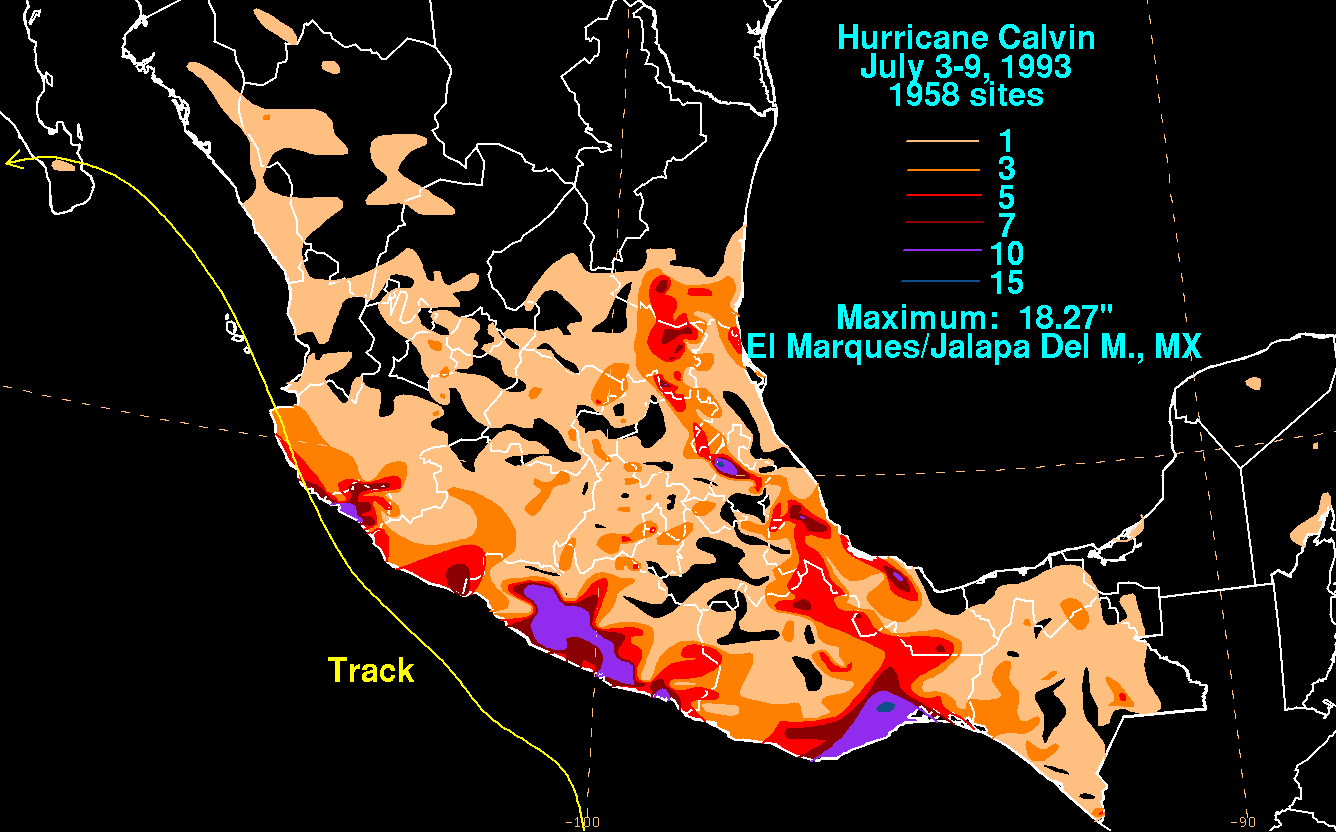
Calvin's rainfall across southern Mexico

Due to the storm's large size, Hurricane Calvin was responsible for heavy flooding along much of the coast of Mexico, and after moving onshore as a hurricane, two locations (El Marques, Japala Del) reported as high as 18.27 in (464 mm) of rain. The flooding led to mudslides, killing 28 people on land, with 30,000 people displaced. Most of the casualties were indirect. In all, 37 people perished due to Hurricane Calvin. Nationwide 42,063 people were evacuated from their homes. Numerous seaside restaurants were washed off their respective foundations. Banana, mango, and corn plantations were also destroyed by the strong winds. Coconut trees were reportedly brought down as well.

In Puebla, a peasant died. Inland, 16 persons were killed in the states of Mexico and San Luis Potosí, where heavy rains caused mudslides across higher elevations. In the latter, 11 deaths were reported as two rivers had overflowed their banks while in the former, five people died. Moreover, six people riding in a taxi died in Veracruz during Calvin. Across Nayarit, Calvin brought heavy rains to the state. Later in its duration, Calvin struck the Baja California peninsula, though the storm had weakened considerably by that time Offshore, three ships containing 659 immigrants were intercepted by the storm, but the ship sustained no damage.

In all, the damage from Hurricane Calvin amounted to over 100 million new pesos, or $32 million (1993 USD). Despite the devastation, many vacationers did not alter their plans because of the hurricane.

=== Oaxaca ===
Prior to affecting Guerrero, Hurricane Calvin was responsible for heavy rains and widespread flooding across Oaxaca. An estimated 7,000 were left homeless along the Oaxacan coast and on the Isthmus of Tehuantepec. In addition, travel from the isthmus was cut off due to mudslides that blocked portions of the Pan-American Highway. Two rivers threatened to overflow their banks while the Benito, Juarez, and Yosocuta dams attained peak capacity and thus the gates were opened to prevent overflowing. A total of 42 communities were flooded. The cities of Tehuantepec, Salina Cruz, Juchtianm, and Tuxtepec were flooded due to extended periods of torrential rains. Across the state, the rains blocked highways and knocked out electrical, telephone, and water services. About 3,000 people took refuge to shelters and one person was killed.

=== Guerrero ===
In Acapulco, waves of 15 ft (4.6 m) moved through the city. In several states, between 5 in (130 mm) to 10 in (250 mm) inches of rain was recorded. However, in Las Pilas, the highest rainfall total was observed, at 16.34 in (415 mm).

Prior to landfall, the storm's outer rainbands began to spread over the region, resulting in flooding. Throughout Acapulco, the storm uprooted 100 trees and caused some damage to roads. Although the city escaped significant damage, many huts were damaged and 1,600 people were left homeless. Citywide six people were killed while two other fisherman were missing. A mudslide killed a man and a son one person was reported dead after trying to save his boat from sinking. In addition, 13 boats sunk due to high waves, which impeded all maritime activity along the coast. In the city of Zihuatanejo, heavy rains flooded streets; consequently, "waist-deep" water was reported in some parts of the city. As a result, tourists were evacuated to higher ground. A total of 2,000 people were forced to abandon their homes. Two people sustained minor injuries when a tree was uprooted. Many neighborhoods throughout Acapulco were flooded. Overall, several beach communities were destroyed, almost 1,000 dwellings were destroyed, thousands of people were left homeless, and many areas remained without electricity.

Statewide, the majority of storm damage occurred over a 4 mi (6 km) stretch of road, which was situated about 25 mi (40 km) north of Acapulco. About a dozen small wood-built restaurants were swept away by high waves. At a nearby small beach resort, four cottages were damaged due to the winds and were later swept away. One two-story hotel was nearly destroyed as all that remained undamaged after the storm was a swimming pool. In a resort town situated 18 mi (29 km) northwest of the city, high waves pounded many small resorts.

=== Colima ===
Following Calvin's closest approach to Manzanillo, the Mexican Weather Service station in the city recorded a minimum barometric pressure of 986.5 mbar (29.13 inHg), as well as 84 mph (135 km/h) surface winds as the center of Calvin passed a little to the west. The Instituto Oceanografico del Pacifico in Manzanillo reported a minimum central pressure of 994 mbar (29.4 inHg) in addition to gale-force winds. Statewide, sustained winds of 60 mph (97 km/h) were observed around 1300 UTC. Shortly thereafter, near 1545 UTC, sustained winds of 35 mph (56 km/h) with gusts up to 45 mph (72 km/h) were reported in Manzanillo. Offshore, several ships reported rough weather during Calvin's existence, with the Pacific Sandpiper reporting a maximum wave height of 44 ft (13 m).

Two fatalities occurred offshore when a trimaran capsized; two fishermen were also reported missing. A pair children were killed by a mudslide. Damage to boats and shoreline structures extended from Acapulco to Manzanillo. Electrical and water services were cut off to the city of Mazanillio. In all, 4,000 people were evacuated from their homes throughout the state. Several ports were also closed. Throughout Colima, lime and mango crops sustained $4.3 million in damage.

=== Michoacán ===
In the state of Michoacán, 700 homes were destroyed. Moreover, many bridges and highways were destroyed due to a 15 ft (4.6 m) storm surge. A total of 4,000 persons fled their homes in Michoacan, including 3,000 alone in Lázaro Cárdenas. Crop damage in both this state and Colima totaled to $7 million. Numerous communities were completely evacuated.

Although initially not expected to pose a threat to the chemicals on the ship Betula, rough seas near Lázaro Cárdenas caused all 4,000 t (4,000,000 kg) of sulfuric acid to leak aboard the previously beached cargo tanker. The tow line snapped when a tug was taking it out to sea. Two of the four tanks broke off by July 7. The Mexican Navy then decided it would be best to tow the ship to shore and neutralize the battery acid that the ship contained. It was estimated that such project could take two weeks.

=== Jalisco ===
Shortly after making its first landfall, the storm moved over a sparsely populated portion of Mexico near Puerto Vallarta. Throughout the region from Manzanillo to Puerto Vallarta, no deaths were reported. However, phones and power services were disrupted and many roads were blocked due to extensive flooding. However, further details about impact could not be obtained due to lack of communication, though some places sustained waist-high water. However, the resort city of Puerto Vallarta itself was spared, receiving just some rain and light winds. About 60 mi (95 km) south of the city, numerous coastal roads were destroyed due to mudslides. In all, 10 towns were flooded.

== Aftermath ==
During the aftermath of the storm, troops were called in to deliver aid to the victims of the storm. A state of emergency was declared in at least ten states in Mexico following Calvin's passage. Furthermore, Mexican officials implemented emergency measures with assistance of agencies such as the Mexican Army and the local health department in most of the devastated areas. Civil protection authorities donated food to more than 40,000 people for three days. They distributed around 11,000 blankets, 5,000 mattresses, 8,000 sacks of sand to reinforce dikes, and an additional 20 t (20,000 kg) of food, medicine, and clothes. Many Los Angeles residents looked for ways to donate aid to the needy. Then-Mexican President Carlos Salinas de Gortari announced that the government would channel $11.4 million to three of the hardest-hit states. The government channeled $2.7 million to Guerrero alone (half of which was supplied to Acapulco) for reconstruction efforts. Michoacan was also expected to receive $4.7 million in aid while Colima was expected to acquire $4 million.

Once the hurricane had moved away from the coast, airports quickly re-opened. Simultaneously, fishermen in Playa Azul protested that their livelihood was endangered due to fishing bans caused by the chemical spill; consequently, in Lázaro Cárdenas, 28 people were arrested while warrants for 526 others' arrest were issued for disturbing peace and blocking highways. This sparked protests from two environmental group as a well a group of Mexican artists. Also, the fisherman demanded a $1 million compensation. Within a week after the storm, additional rains had moved into the area, leading to further damage and eight fatalities.

== See also ==
- List of Pacific hurricanes
- Other storms with the same name
- Hurricane Winifred (1992)
- Hurricane Eugene (1987)
