= List of storms named Eugene =

The name Eugene has been used for eight tropical cyclones in the Eastern Pacific Ocean.

- Tropical Storm Eugene (1981) – a weak storm that did not affect land
- Hurricane Eugene (1987) – Category 2 storm that made landfall south of Manzanillo, Mexico; caused heavy flooding and loss of power for Mexican coastal region
- Hurricane Eugene (1993) – Category 3 storm that made landfall on the Big Island of Hawaii as a tropical depression
- Hurricane Eugene (1999) – Category 2 storm that remained at sea, passing well south of Hawaii
- Tropical Storm Eugene (2005) – briefly threatened Baja California Sur, but remained at sea
- Hurricane Eugene (2011) – reached Category 4 intensity, but was no threat to land
- Hurricane Eugene (2017) – Category 3 storm that remained at sea
- Tropical Storm Eugene (2023) – passed near Baja California Sur, but moved out to sea

The name Eugene was used unofficially for one North American blizzard.

- Blizzard Eugene – better known as the March 2017 North American blizzard
