= List of storms named Calvin =

The name Calvin has been used for eight tropical cyclones in the East Pacific Ocean and one European windstorm.

In the East Pacific:

- Tropical Storm Calvin (1981) – briefly threatened Baja California Sur
- Tropical Storm Calvin (1987) – did not make landfall
- Hurricane Calvin (1993) – a Category 2 hurricane that killed 37 people in Mexico
- Tropical Storm Calvin (1999) – a weak tropical storm which formed over open waters
- Tropical Storm Calvin (2005) – briefly threatened Acapulco but moved away
- Hurricane Calvin (2011) – a Category 1 hurricane that stayed off the coast of Mexico
- Tropical Storm Calvin (2017) – the minimal tropical storm that made landfall in southwestern Mexico
- Hurricane Calvin (2023) – a Category 3 hurricane that passed south of Hawaii as a tropical storm

In Europe:

- Storm Alessio (2025) – named Calvin by the Free University of Berlin

== See also ==
- Cyclone Calvinia (2019) – a South-West Indian Ocean tropical cyclone with a similar name
