= 1954 Pacific hurricane season =

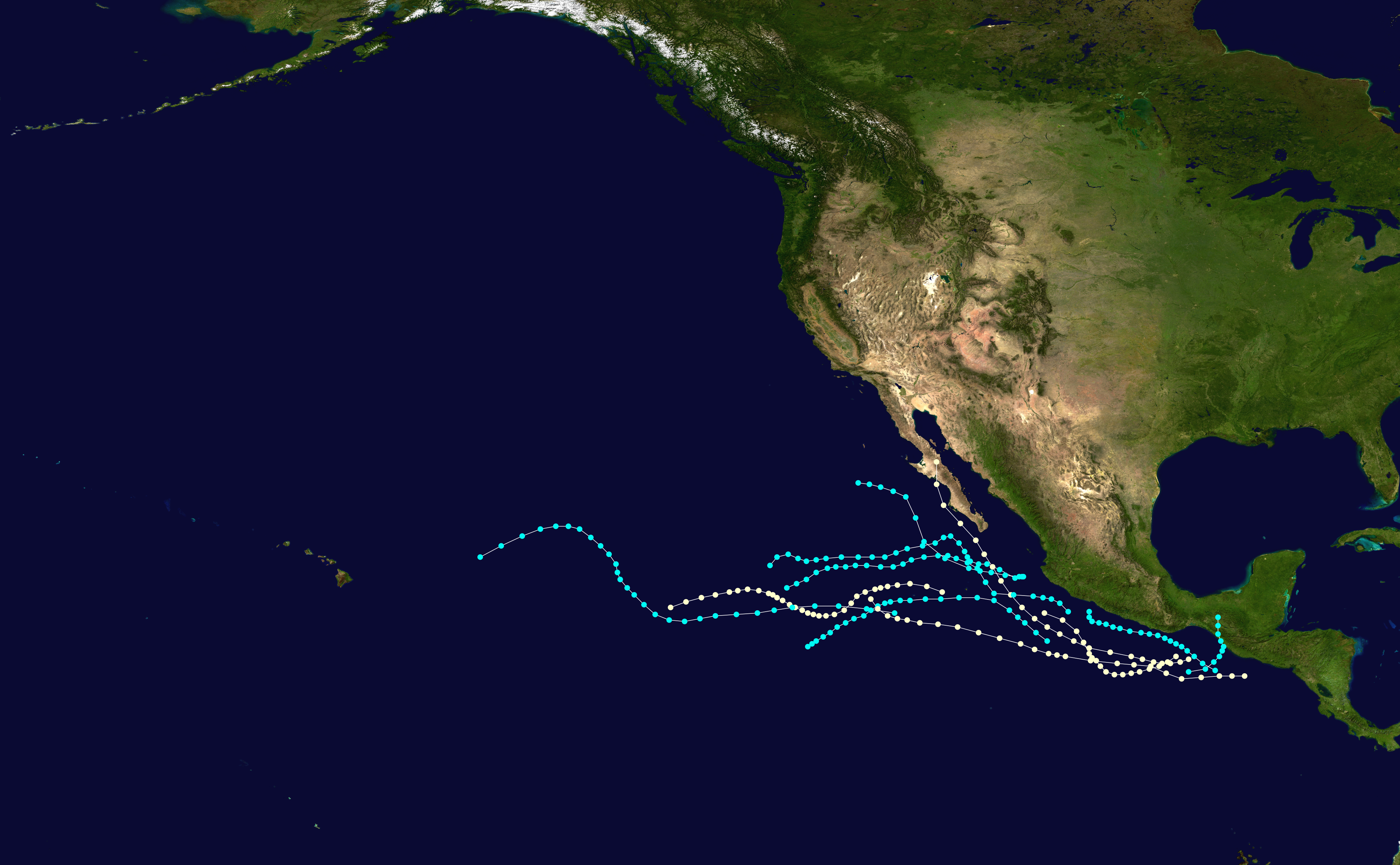
- Season summary map

Seasonal boundaries
- First system formed: June 18, 1954
- Last system dissipated: November 1, 1954

Strongest storm
- By maximum sustained winds: Three, Four, Nine, and Eleven (Note: The pressure record for this season is incomplete, and therefore no ranking by pressure is made.)
  - Maximum winds: 85 mph (140 km/h) (1-minute sustained)

Seasonal statistics
- Total depressions: 11
- Total storms: 11
- Hurricanes: 4
- Major hurricanes (Cat. 3+): 0
- Total fatalities: 5 direct, 35 indirect
- Total damage: Unknown

Related articles
- 1954 Atlantic hurricane season; 1954 Pacific typhoon season; 1950s North Indian Ocean cyclone seasons

The 1954 Pacific hurricane season featured below-average activity, with eleven tropical storms identified. (Note: An average season, based on 1981–2010 averages, is defined as 15.4 tropical storms, 7.6 hurricanes, and 3.2 major hurricanes.) The season officially started on May 15 and lasted until November 30. These dates conventionally delimit the period of each year when most tropical cyclones form in the Pacific basin. The majority of the year's storm remained offshore and caused little to no adverse impact on land. However, a tropical storm in October brought flooding rain to Mexico and Guatemala that left five people dead and thousands homeless. An unknown disease in the storm's wake killed a further 35 people.

The relative lack of activity is a byproduct of limited monitoring tools at the time. In 1954, Pacific hurricanes were only able to be identified by ship reports (either post-trip logs or in situ transmissions) and coastal observations. No more than eight coastal cities reported regular observations. Additionally, only two cities, Empalme, Sonora, and Mazatlán, Sinaloa, launched radiosondes—a key factor in detecting tropical cyclones at the time—further limiting detection capabilities.

== Systems ==
=== Tropical Storm One ===
- Tropical storm (SSHWS)
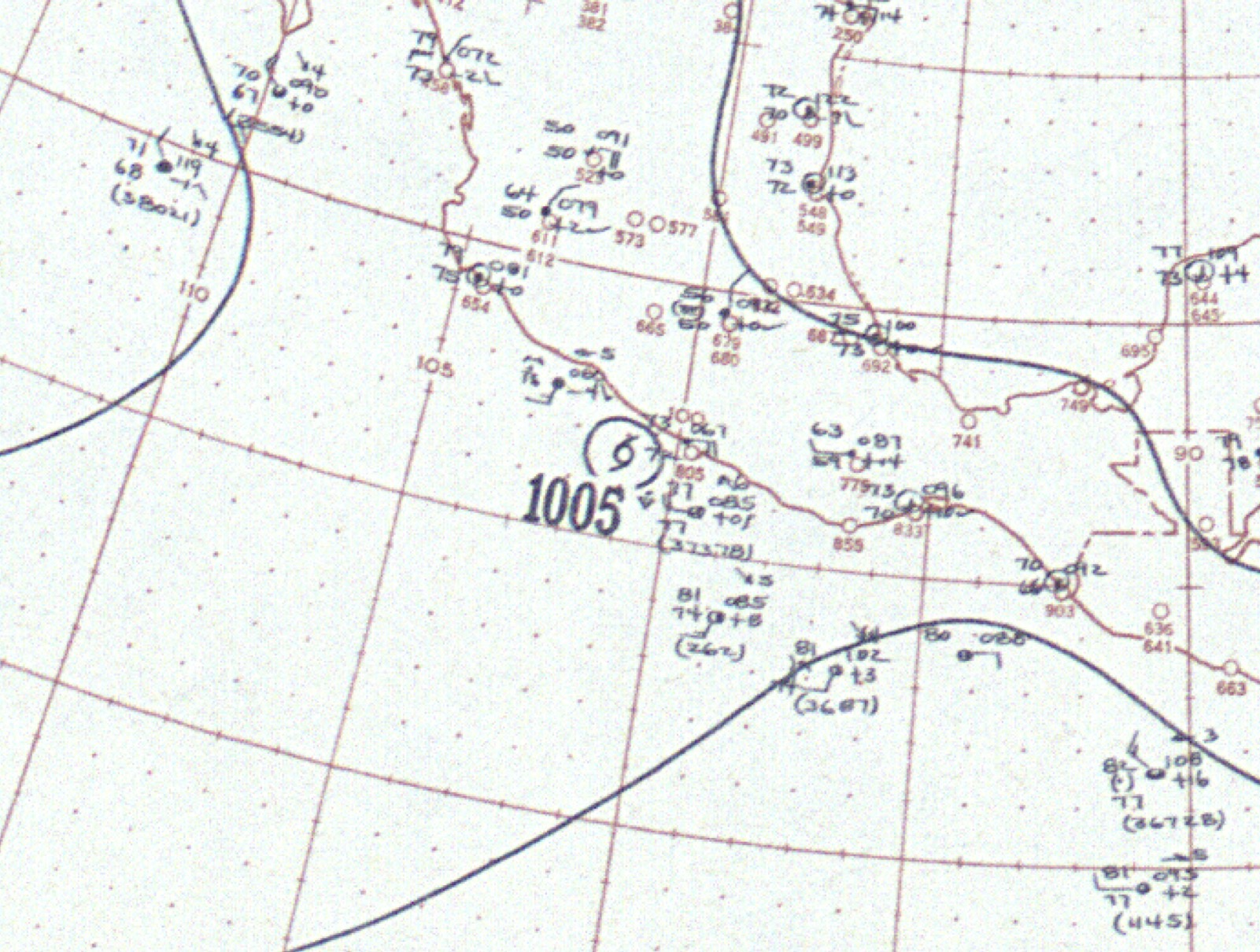
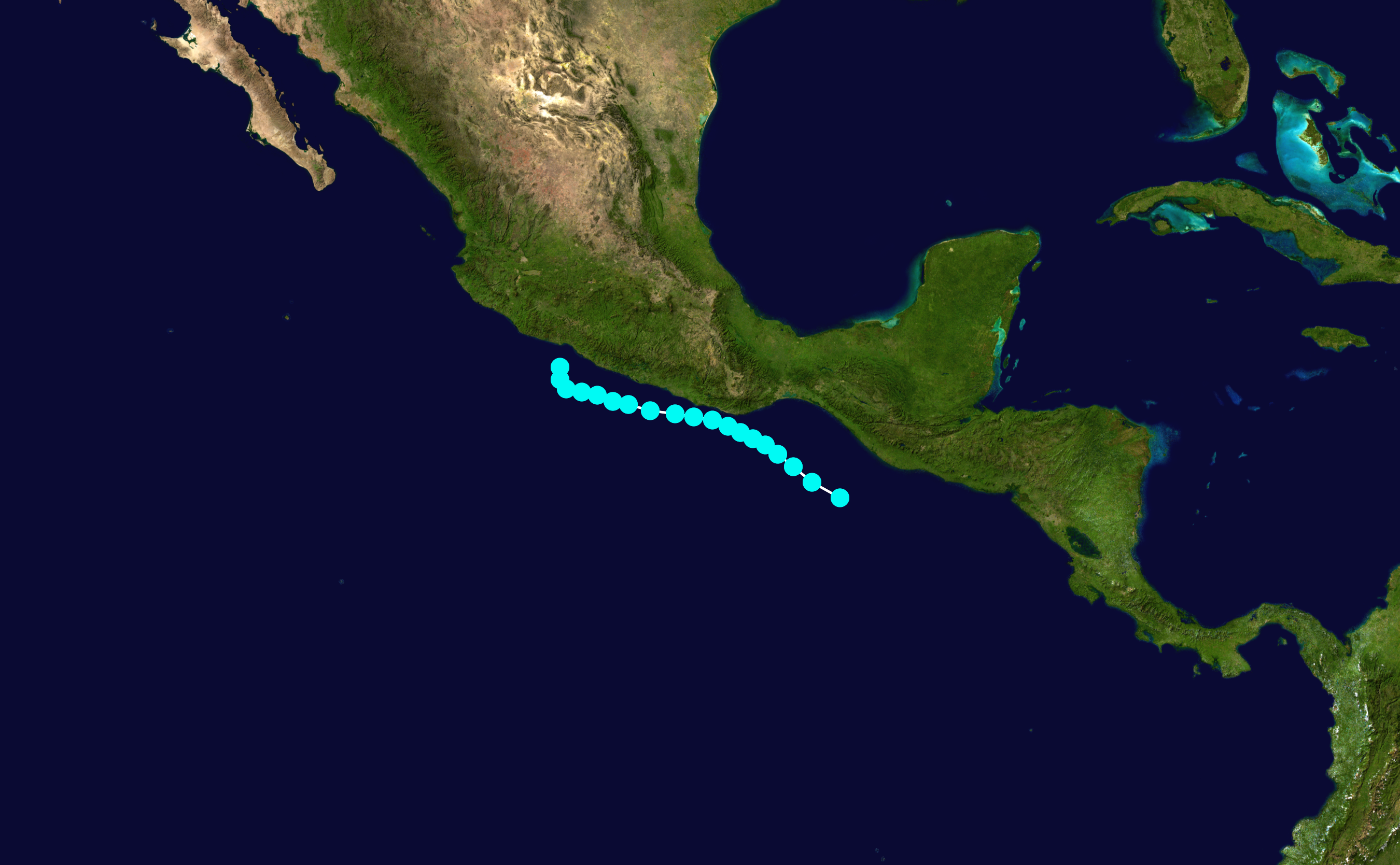
- Duration: June 18 – June 22
- Peak intensity: 50 mph (85 km/h) (1-min); ≤1005 mbar (hPa)

On June 17, an area of low pressure was identified on surface weather maps just off the coast of Guatemala. The following day, the system was classified as a tropical storm approximately 210 mi (340 km) southwest of Guatemala City. Tracking generally northwest, the system acquired maximum sustained winds of 50 mph (85 km/h). On June 20–21, the storm moved parallel to the Mexican coastline before turning north on June 22. It was last noted offshore on this day, approximately 50 mi (85 km) south of Lázaro Cárdenas, Michoacán.

=== Tropical Storm Two ===
- Tropical storm (SSHWS)
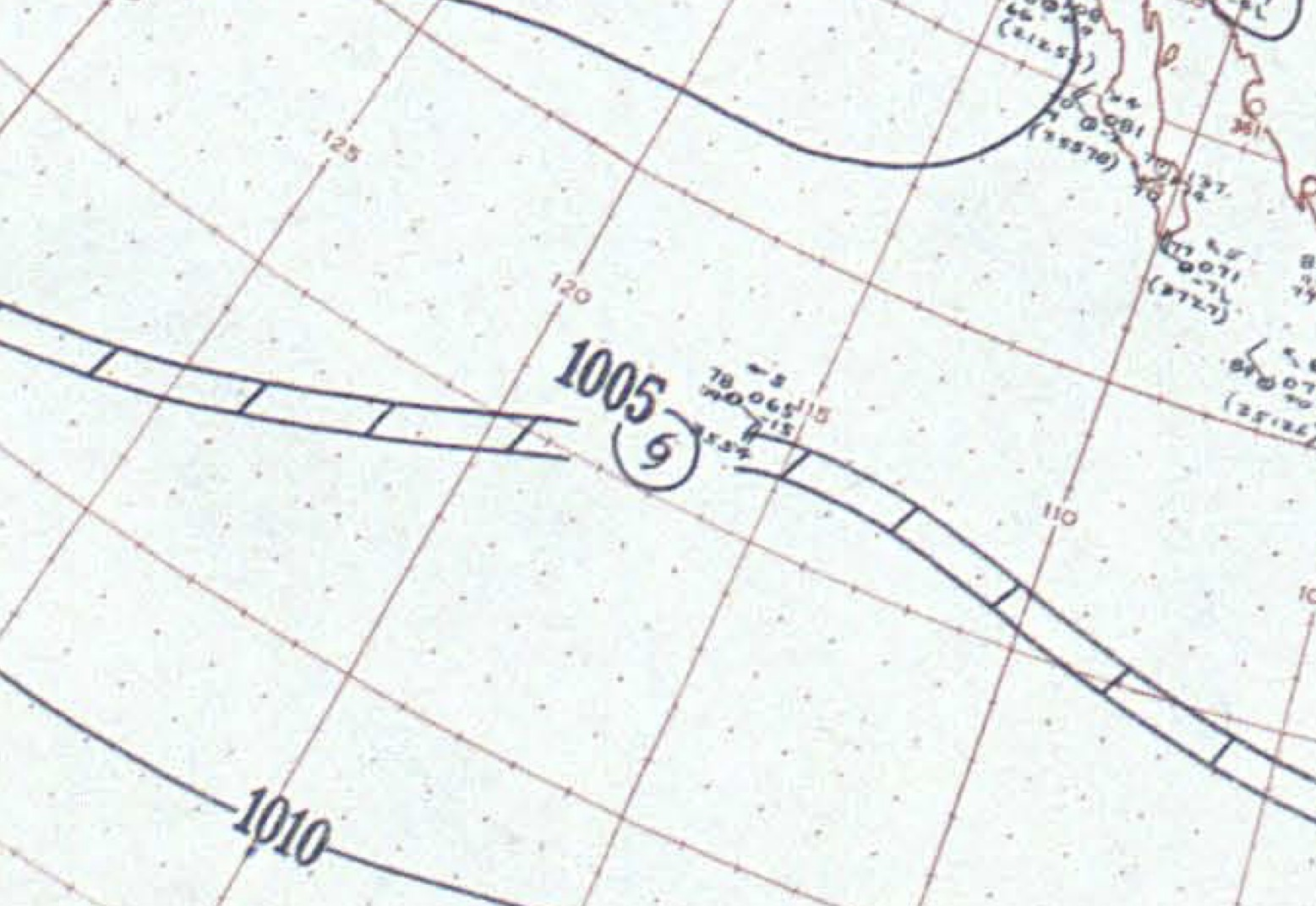
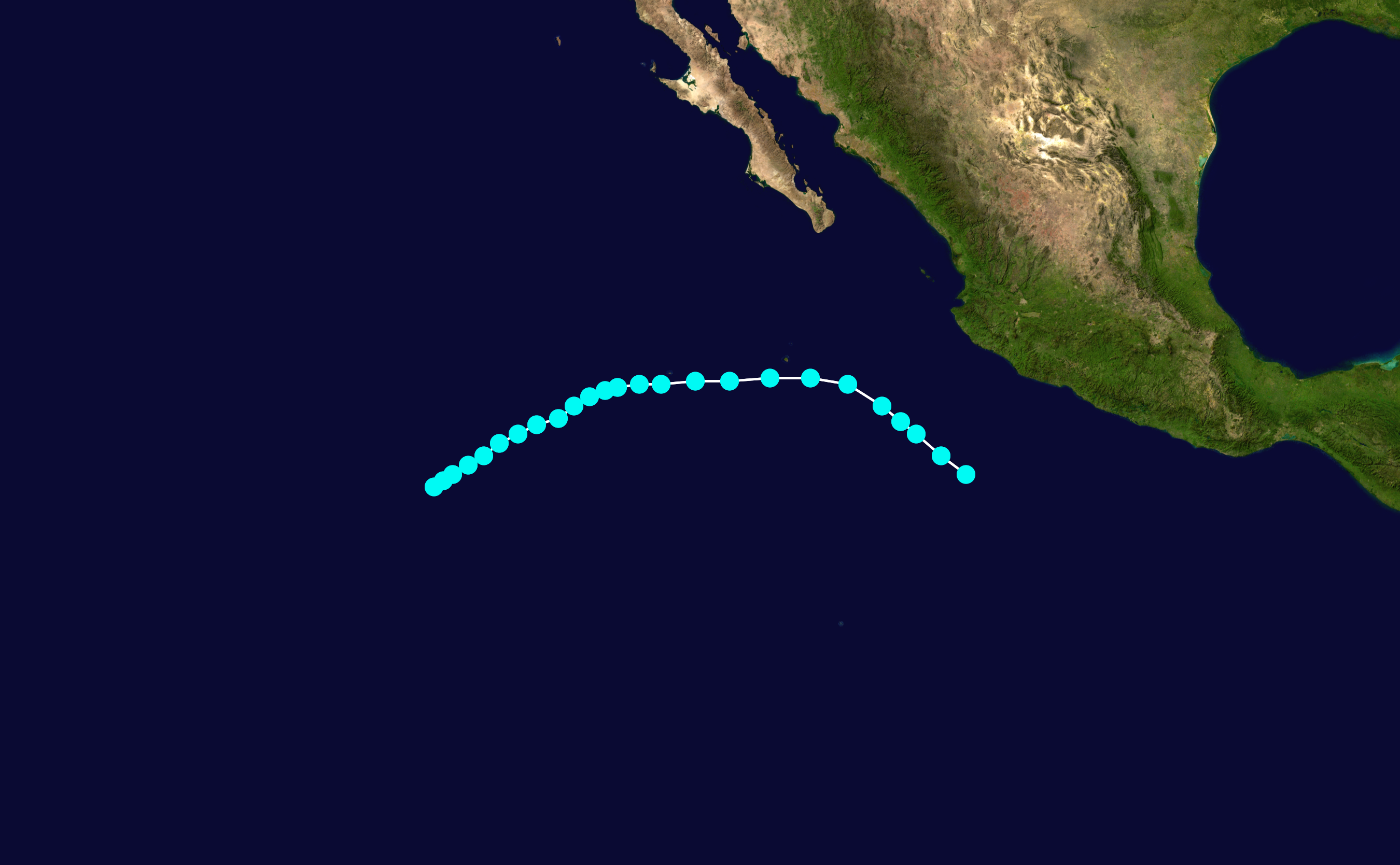
- Duration: July 10 – July 17
- Peak intensity: 50 mph (85 km/h) (1-min); ≤1000 mbar (hPa)

Tropical Storm Two existed from July 10 to July 16.

=== Hurricane Three ===
- Category 1 hurricane (SSHWS)
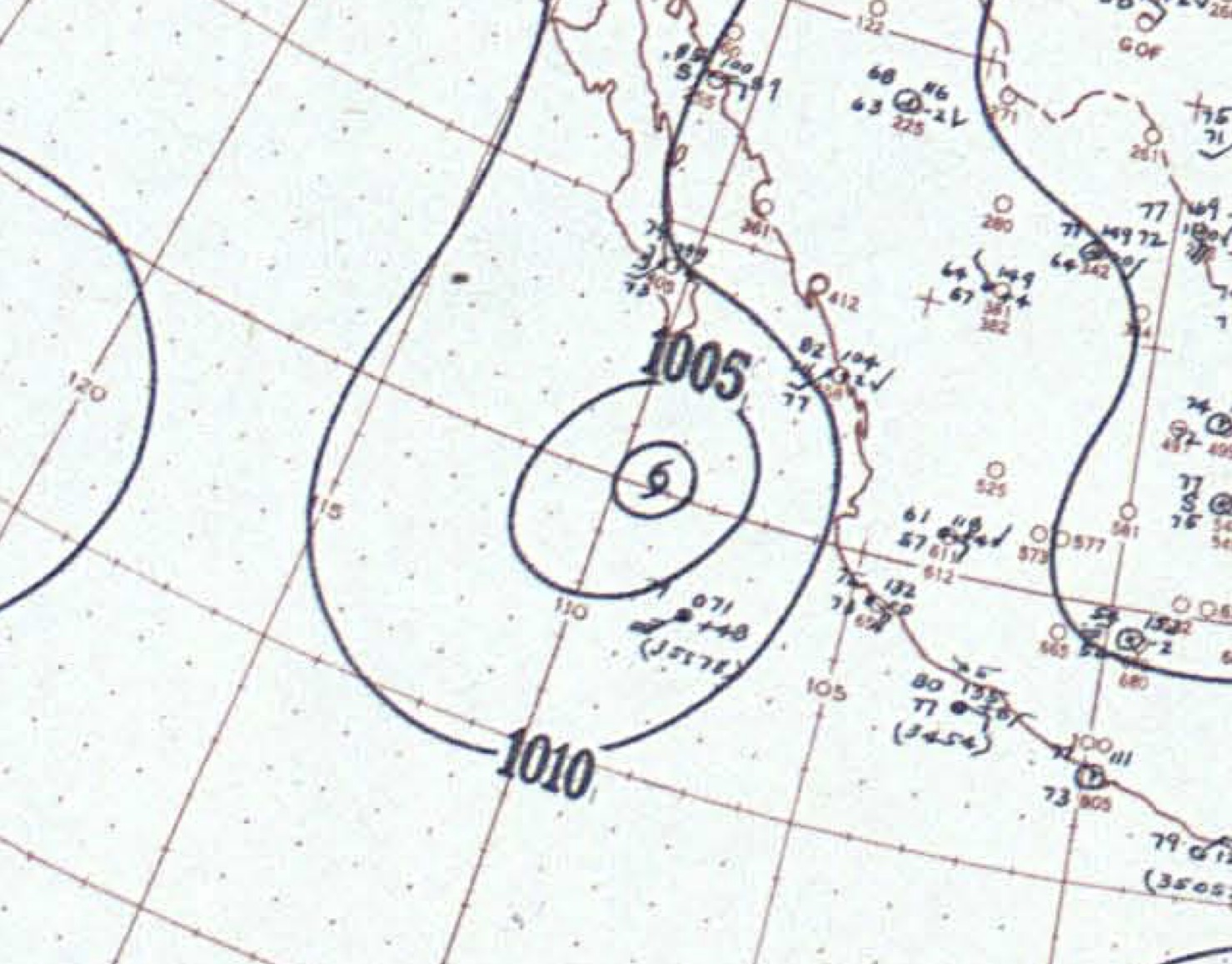
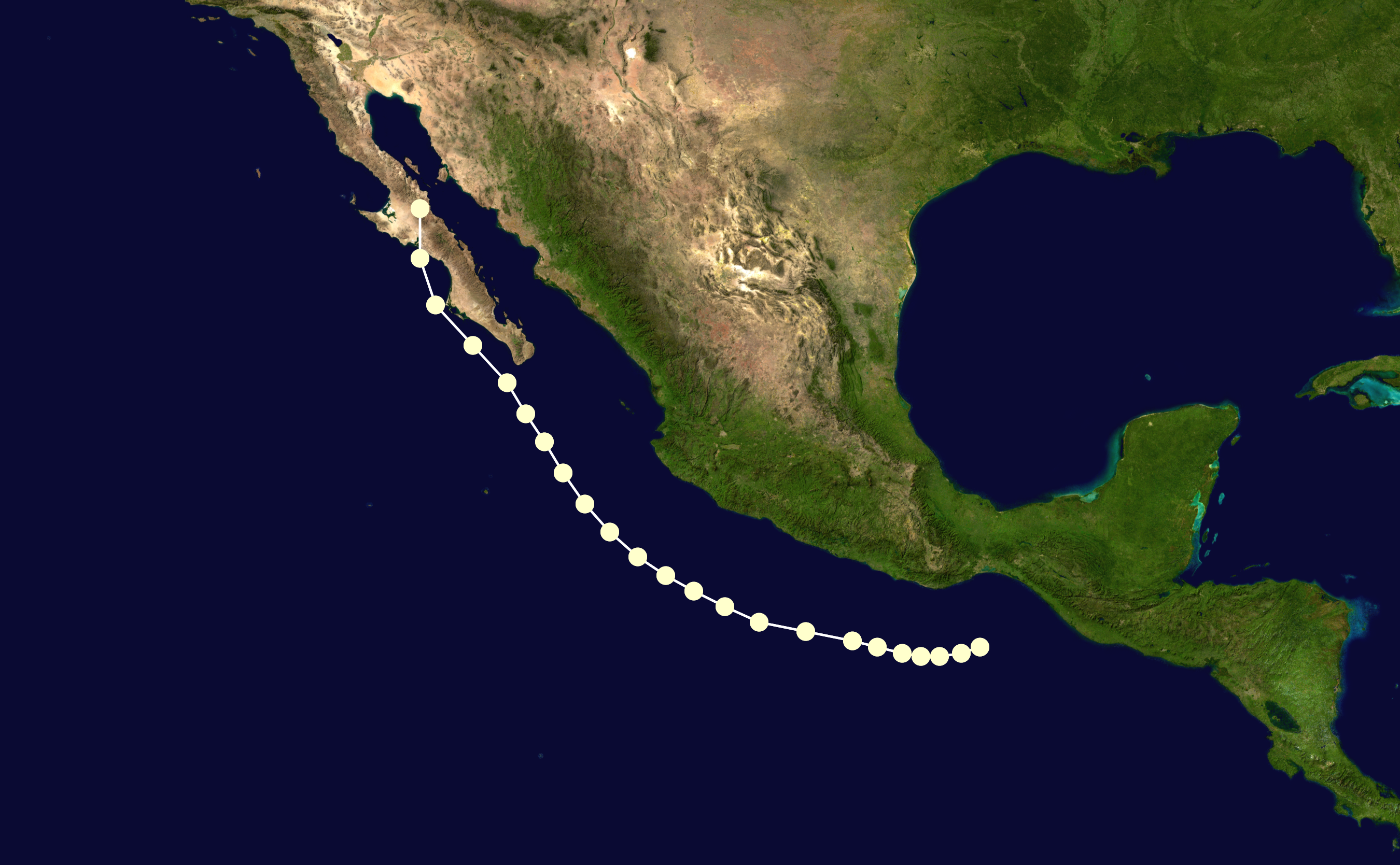
- Duration: July 12 – July 17
- Peak intensity: 85 mph (140 km/h) (1-min);

This hurricane made landfall in the Baja California Peninsula.

Moisture from this system spread across the southwestern United States, reaching 2 in (51 mm) in the deserts of southern California. Floods covered a nearly 8 mi (13 km) portion of U.S. 66.

=== Hurricane Four ===
- Category 1 hurricane (SSHWS)
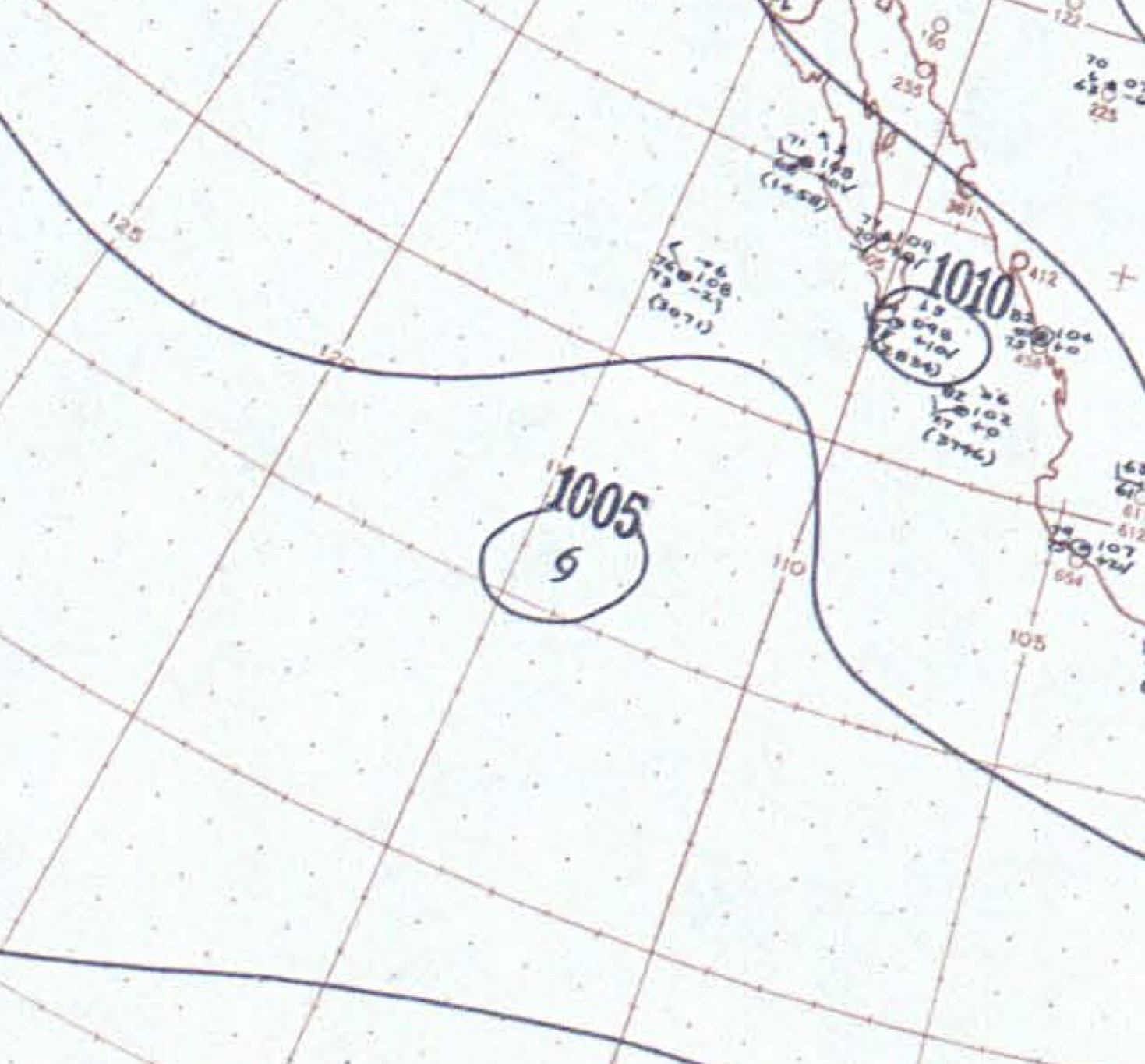
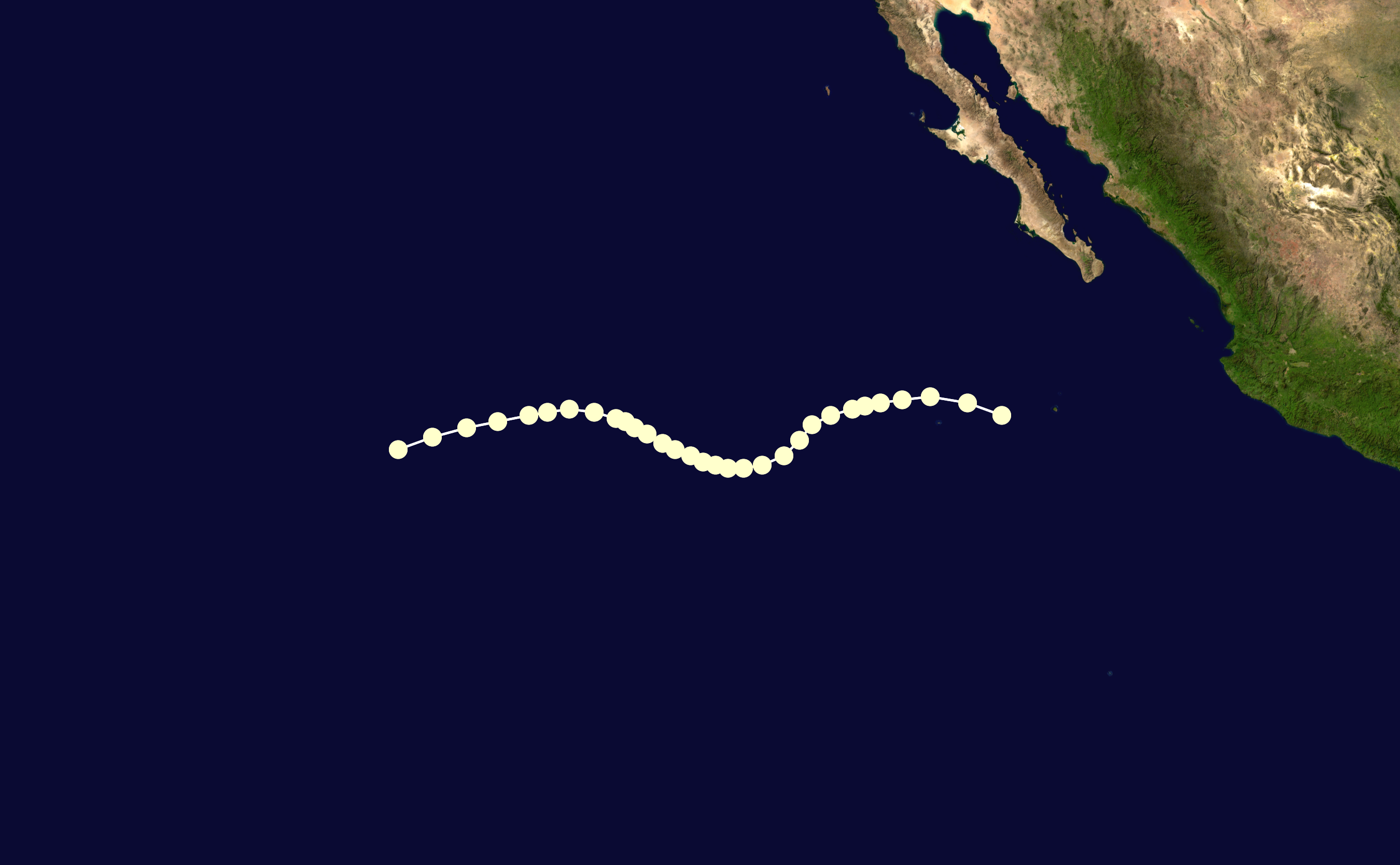
- Duration: July 25 – August 1
- Peak intensity: 85 mph (140 km/h) (1-min);

Hurricane Four existed from July 25 to August 1.

=== Tropical Storm Five ===
- Tropical storm (SSHWS)
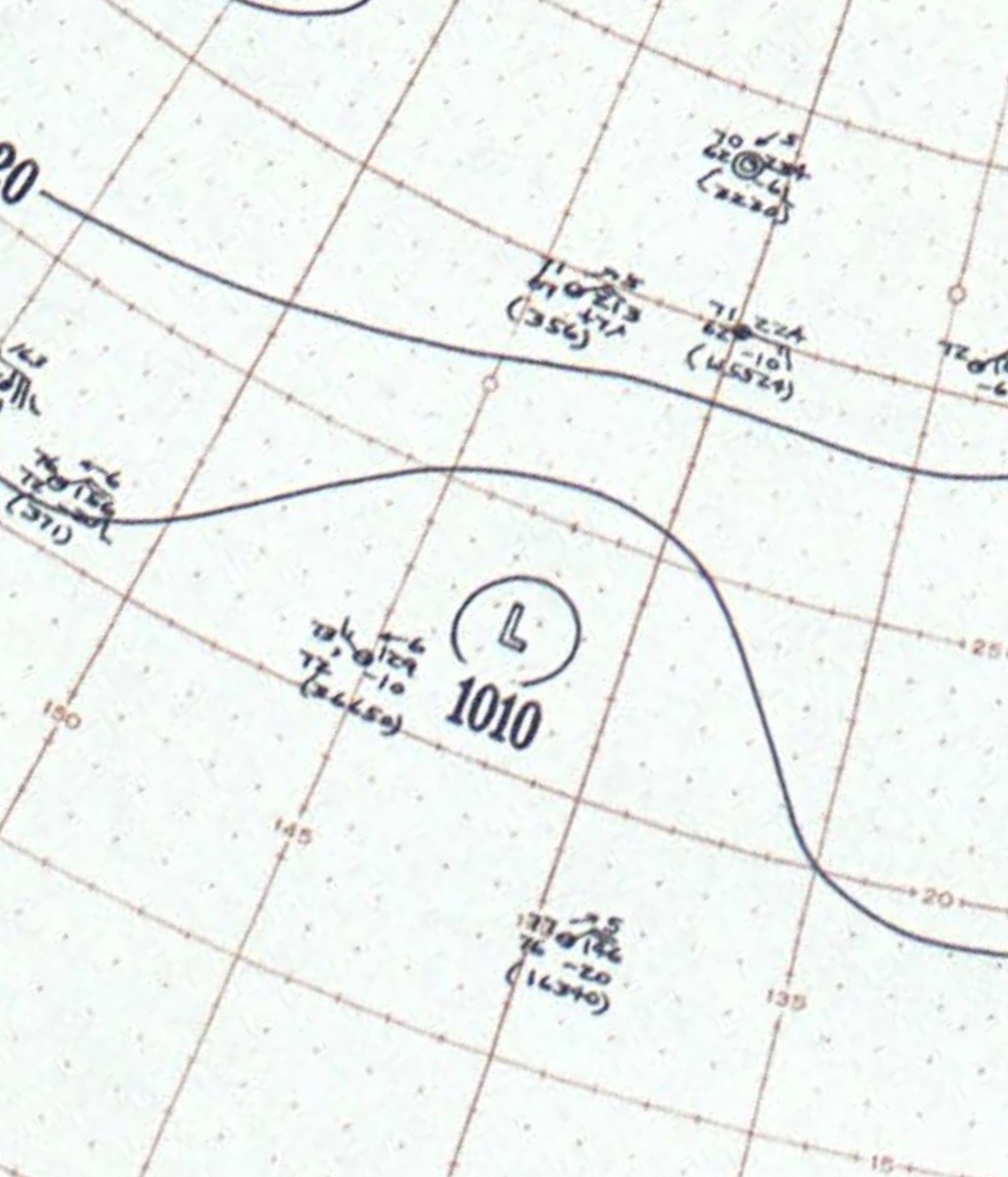
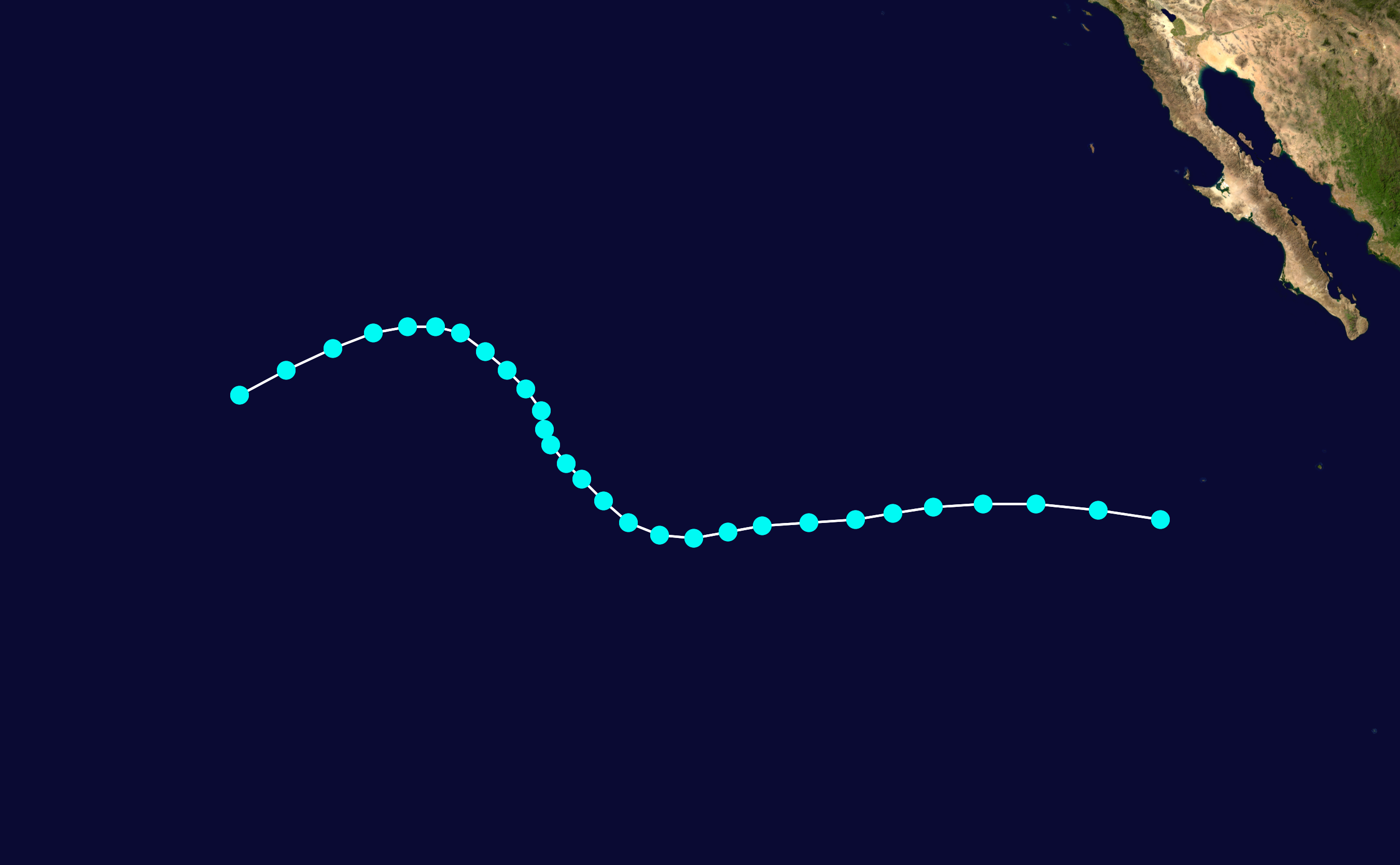
- Duration: September 2 – September 9
- Peak intensity: 50 mph (85 km/h) (1-min);

Tropical Storm Five existed from September 2 to September 9.

=== Tropical Storm Six ===
- Tropical storm (SSHWS)
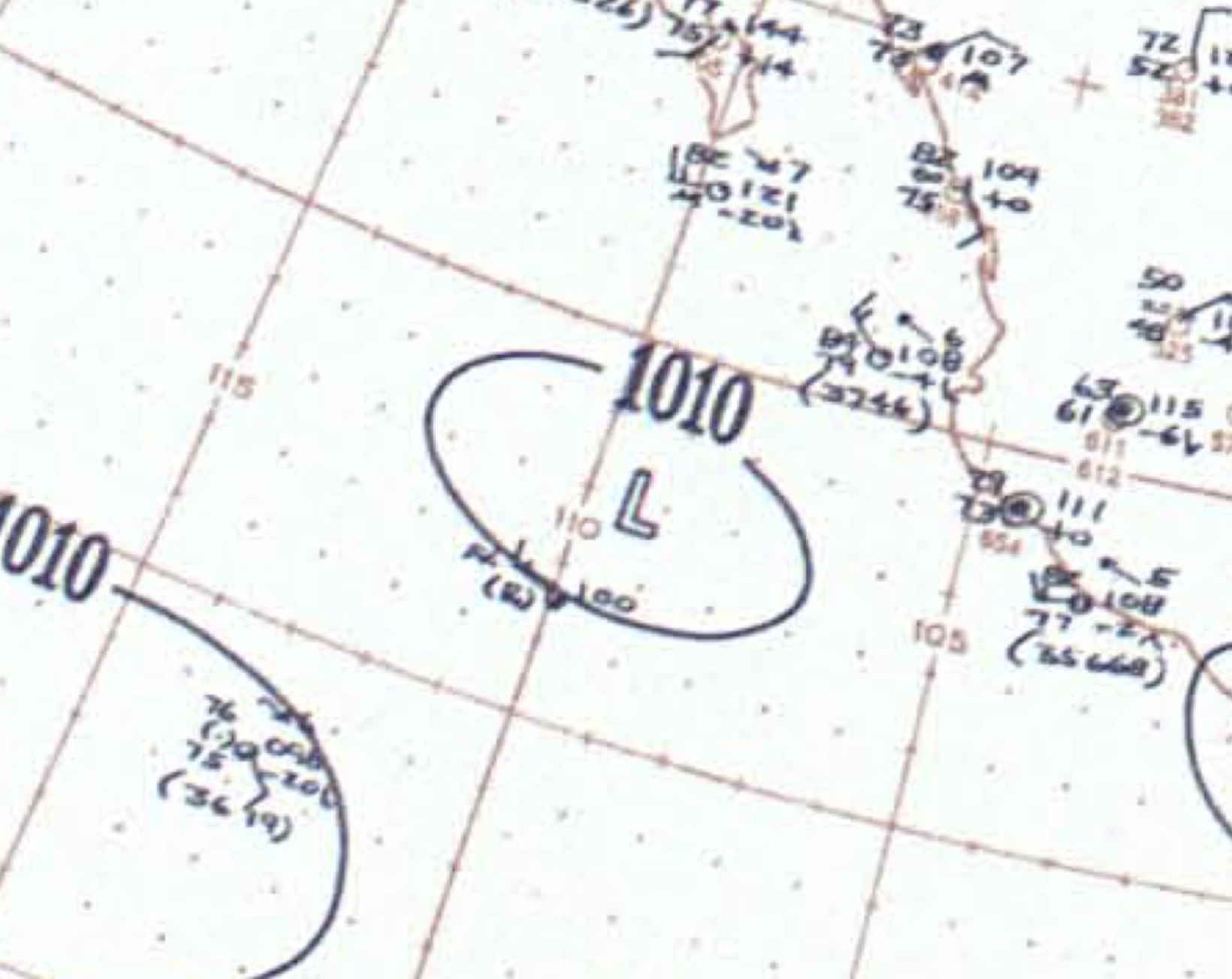
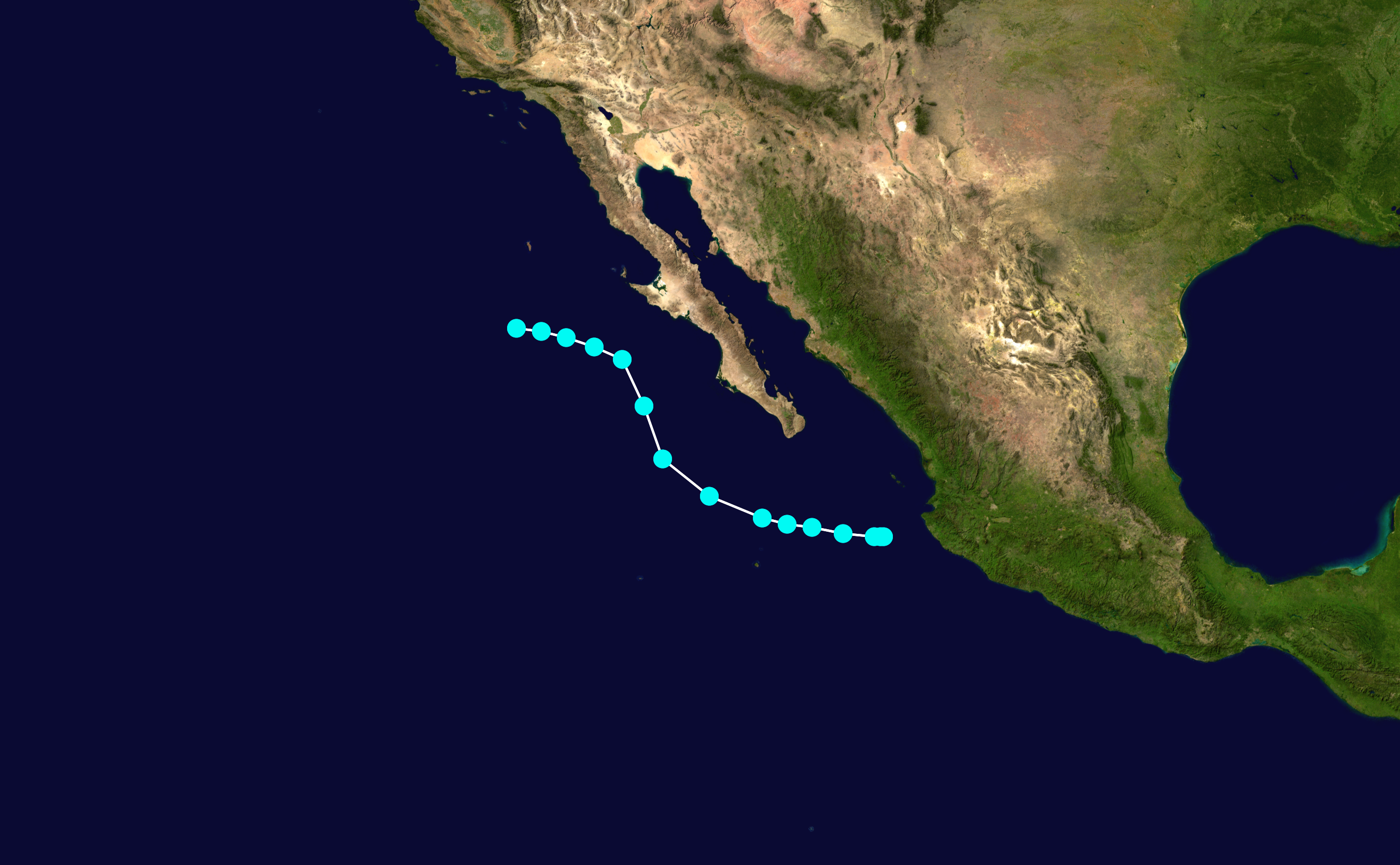
- Duration: September 5 – September 8
- Peak intensity: 50 mph (85 km/h) (1-min);

Tropical Storm Six existed from September 5 to September 9.

=== Tropical Storm Seven ===
- Tropical storm (SSHWS)
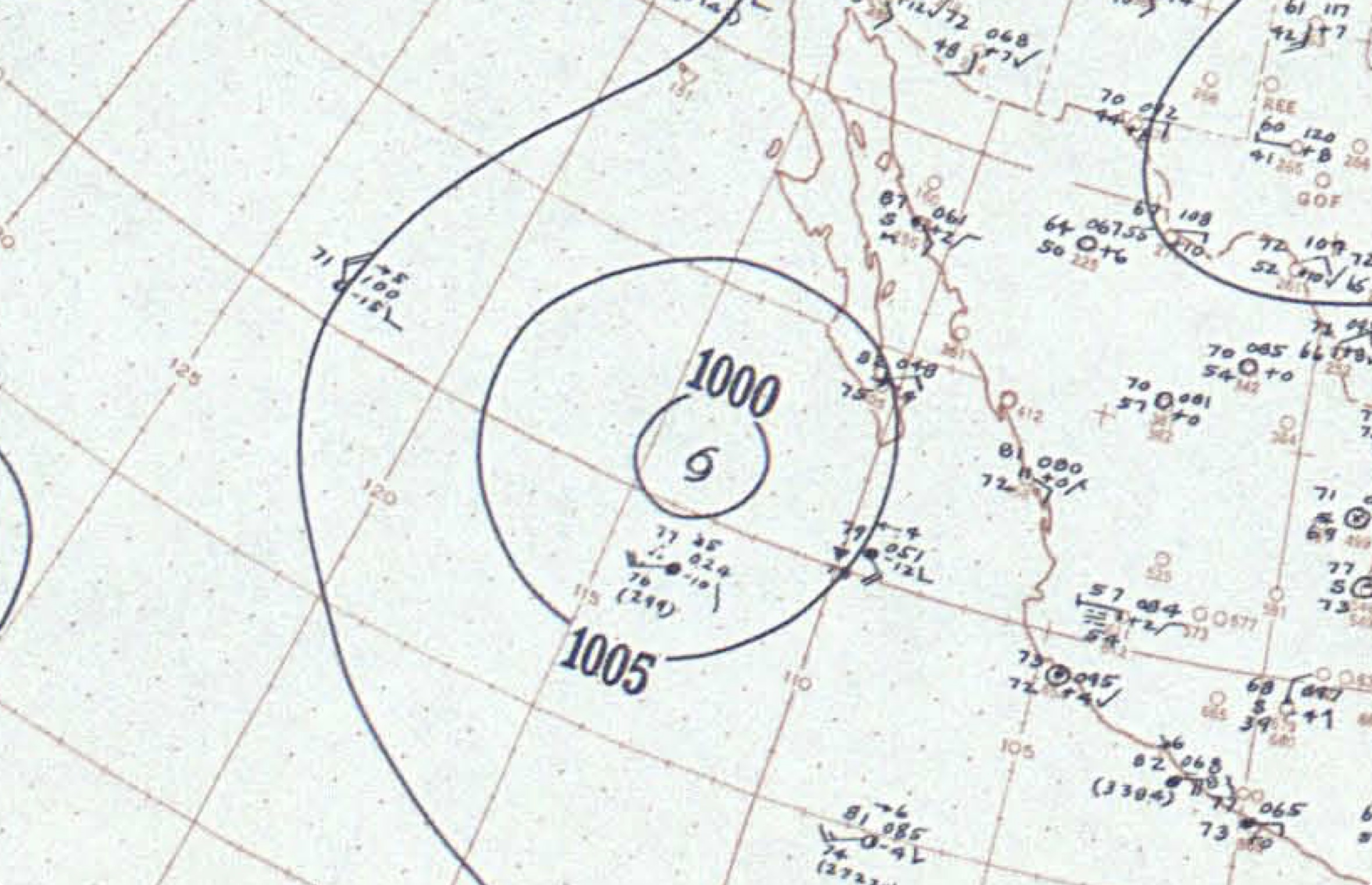
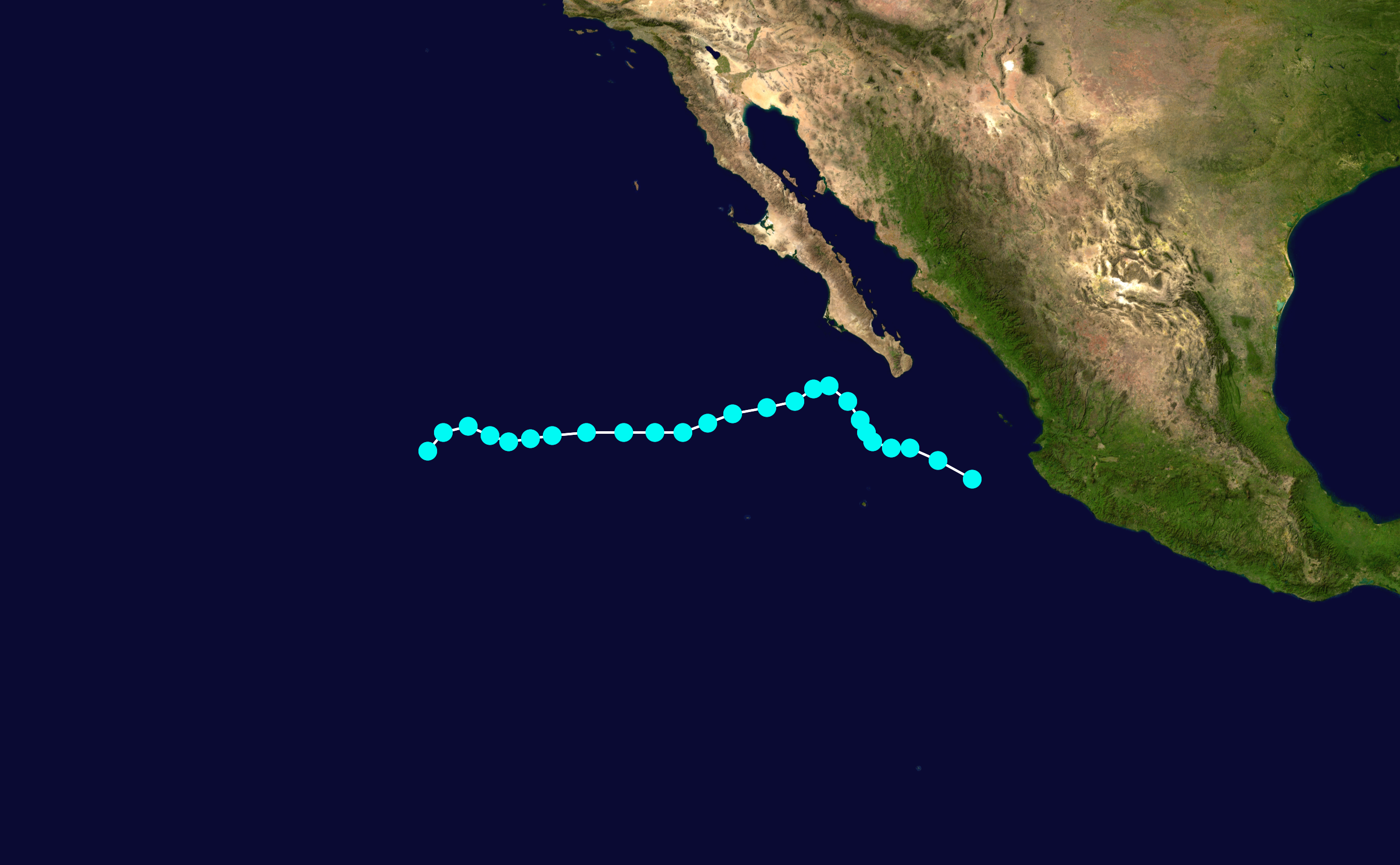
- Duration: September 15 – September 21
- Peak intensity: 50 mph (85 km/h) (1-min); 981 mbar (hPa)

Tropical Storm Seven existed from September 15 to September 21.

=== Tropical Storm Eight ===
- Tropical storm (SSHWS)
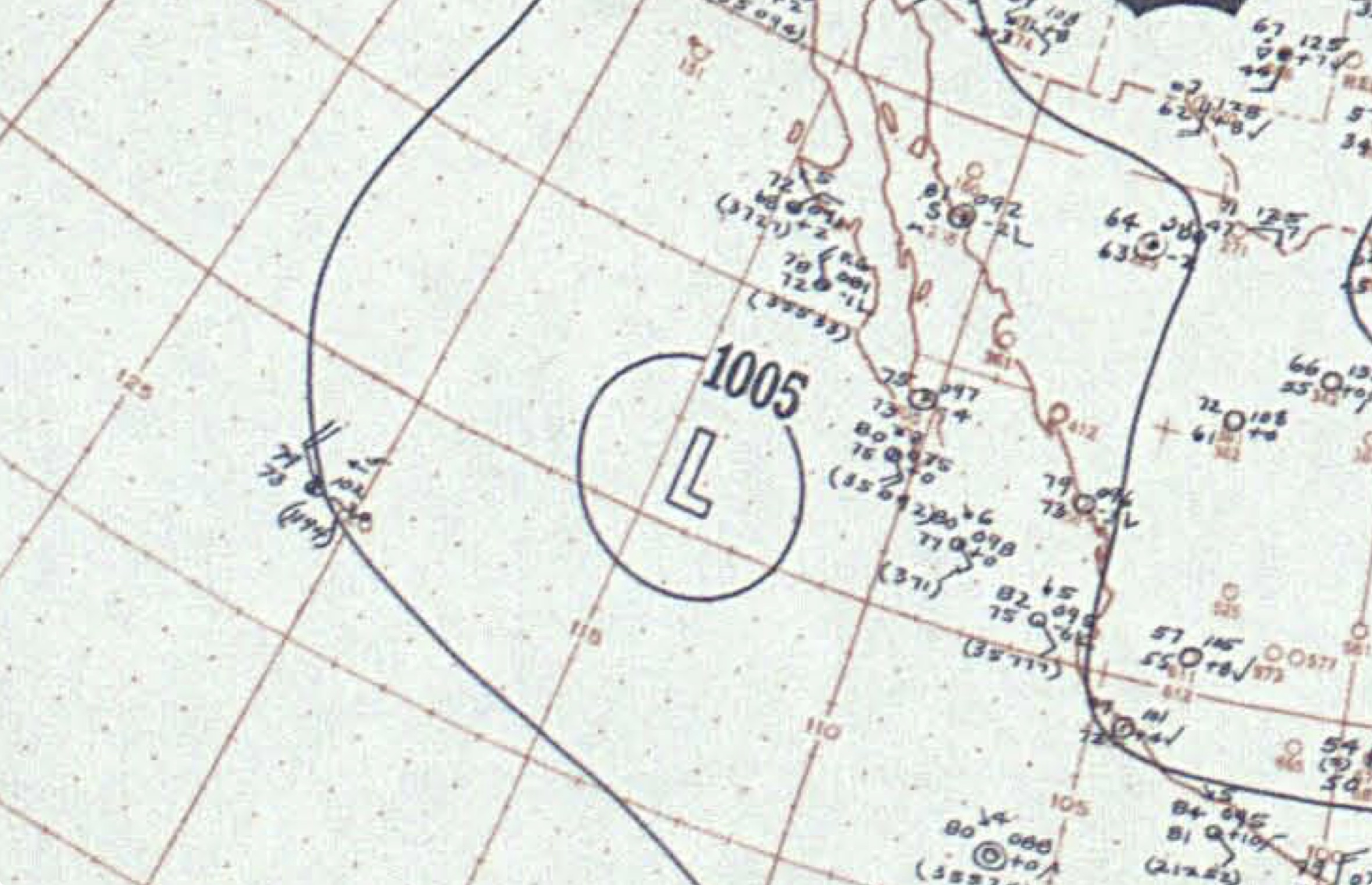
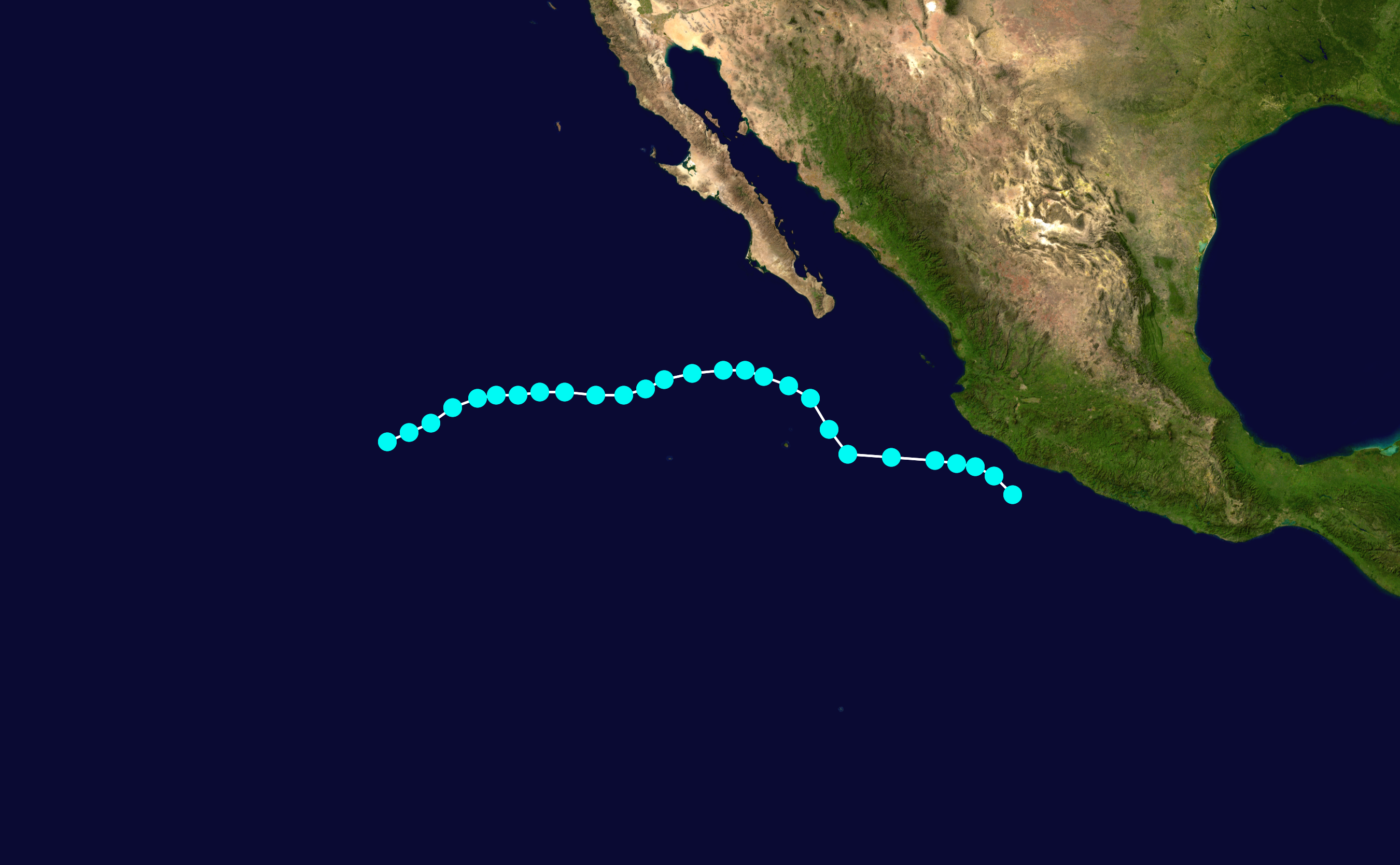
- Duration: September 21 – September 27
- Peak intensity: 50 mph (85 km/h) (1-min);

Tropical Storm Eight existed from September 21 to September 27.

=== Hurricane Nine ===
- Category 1 hurricane (SSHWS)
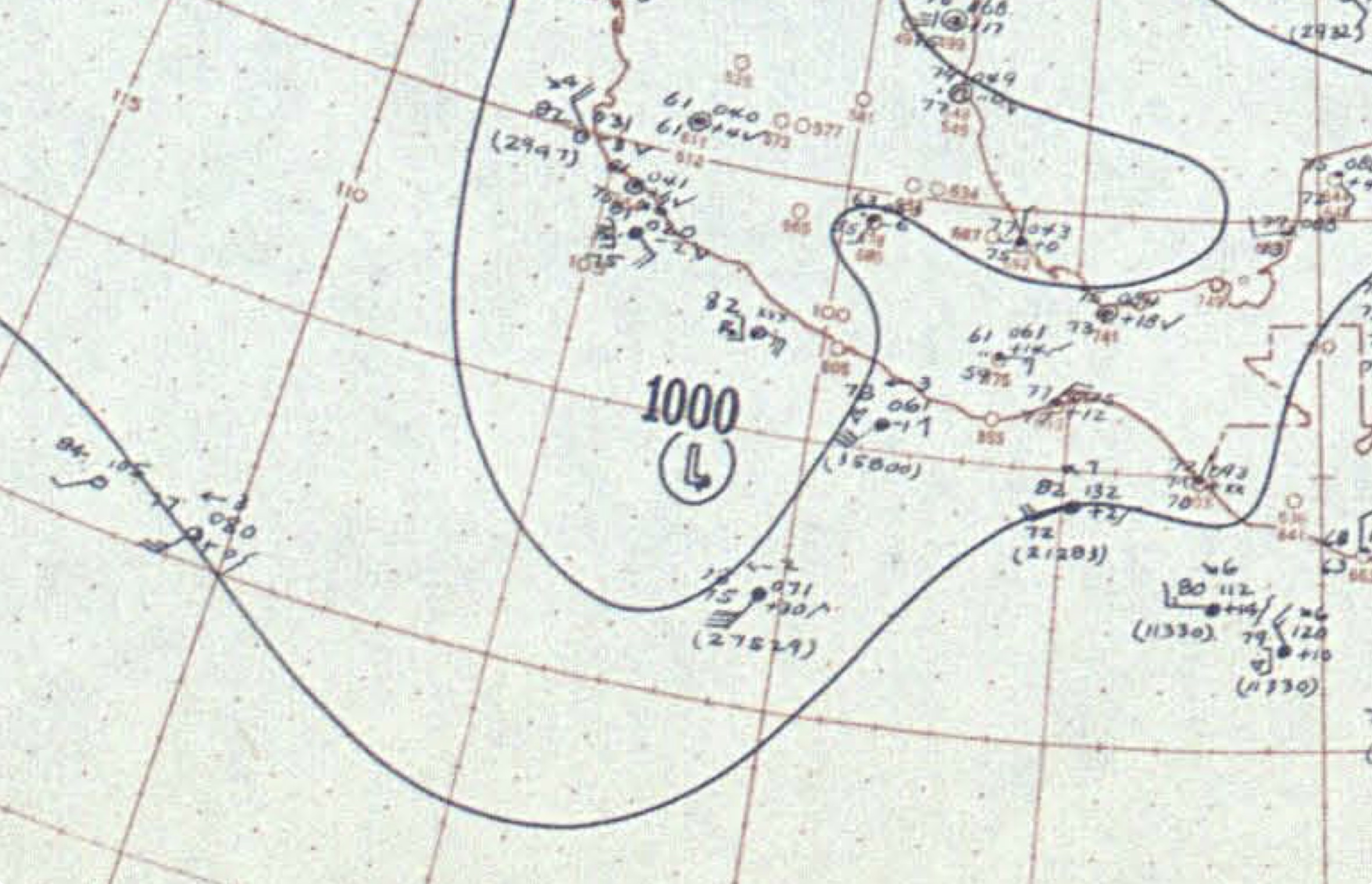
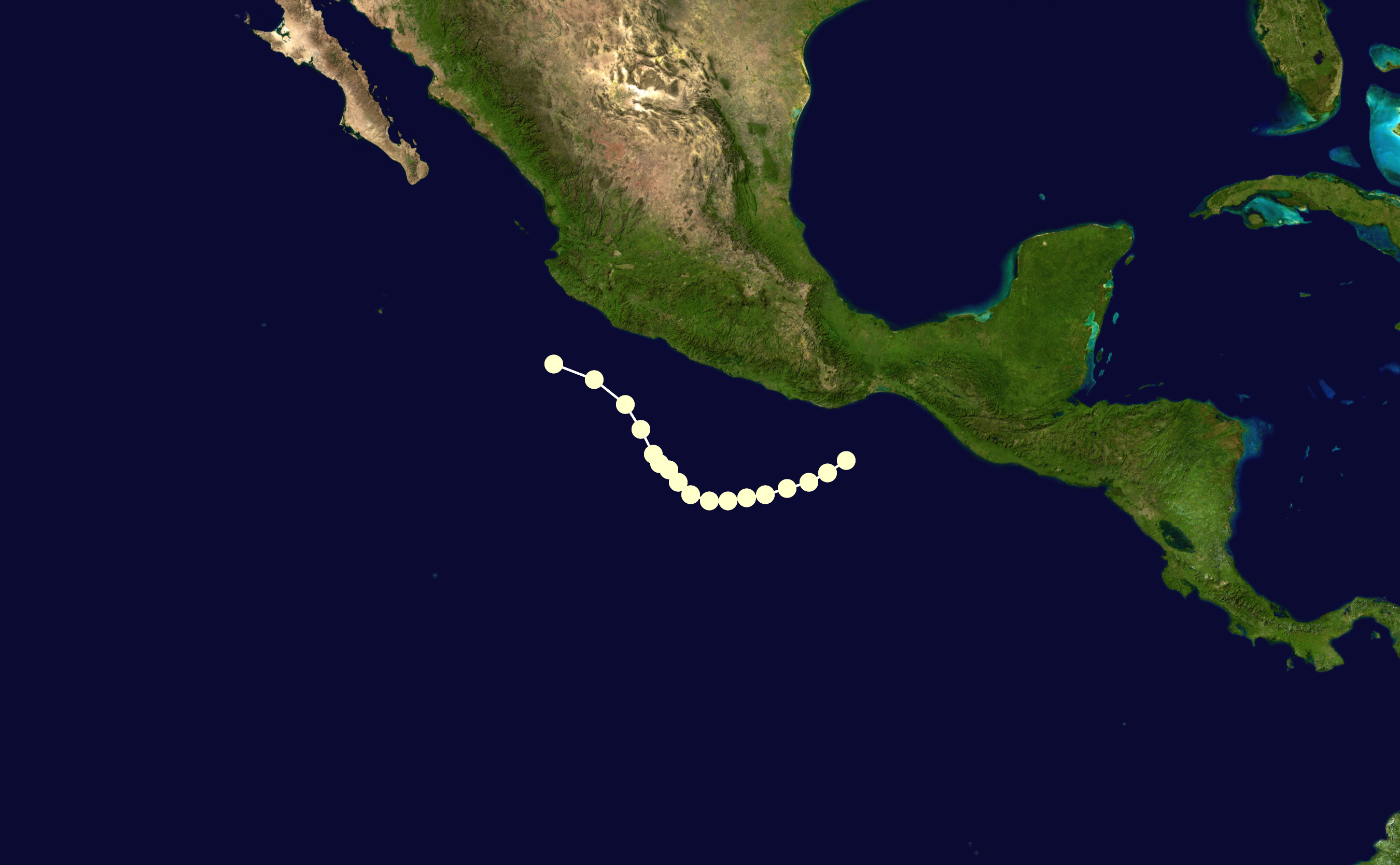
- Duration: September 27 – October 1
- Peak intensity: 85 mph (140 km/h) (1-min);

Hurricane Nine existed from September 27 to October 1.

=== Tropical Storm Ten ===
- Tropical storm (SSHWS)
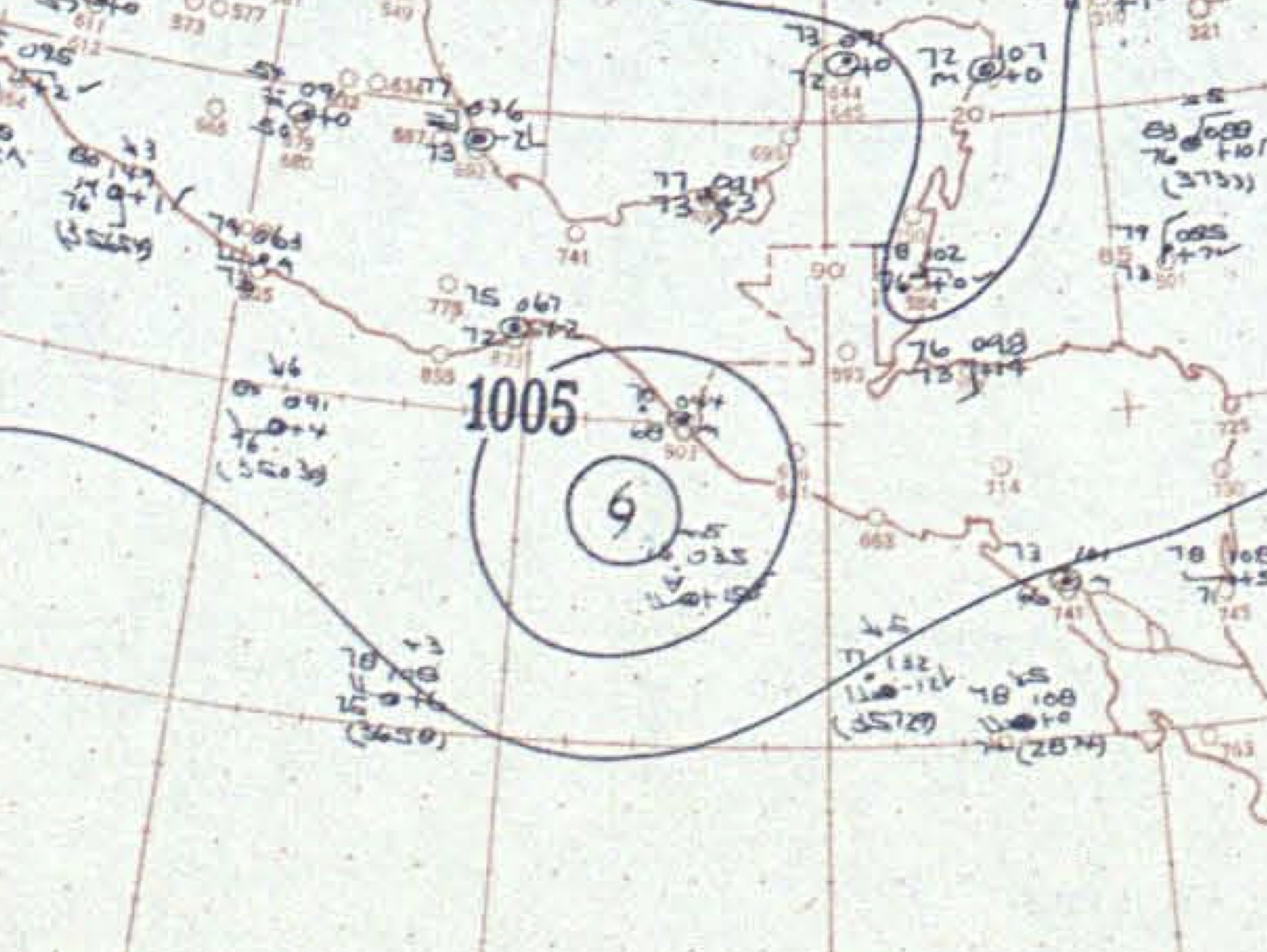
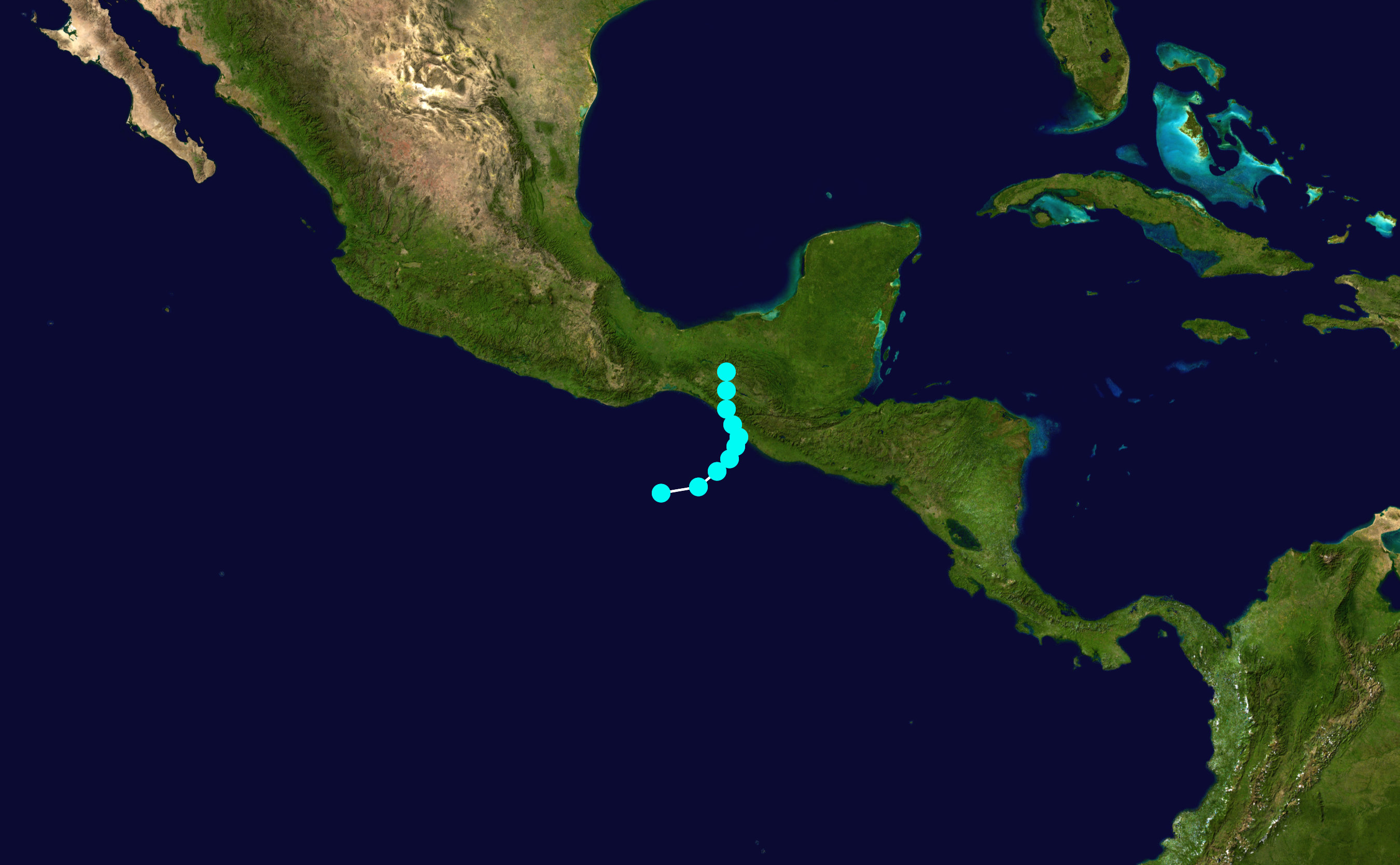
- Duration: October 12 – October 14
- Peak intensity: 50 mph (85 km/h) (1-min); ≤1000 mbar (hPa)

Tropical Storm Ten existed from October 12 to October 14. Surface weather maps indicate the system had a central pressure of at most 1000 mbar (hPa; 29.53 inHg) on October 13.

Heavy rains from the storm affected much of Mexico, impacting areas as far north as Tampico. Flooding along the Pánuco River rendered 160 people homeless; electrical service and water supplies were disrupted. The towns of Panuco and Revenadero were largely destroyed; thousands of acres of crops were submerged and livestock loss was severe. Five people died due to flooding in coastal towns near Tampico. An unidentified disease in the storm's wake claimed 35 lives. Aid workers traveled along the swollen Pánuco River to distribute supplies, including food and snake bite serum. Severe flooding also plagued Guatemala, with thousands rendered homeless.

=== Hurricane Eleven ===
- Category 1 hurricane (SSHWS)
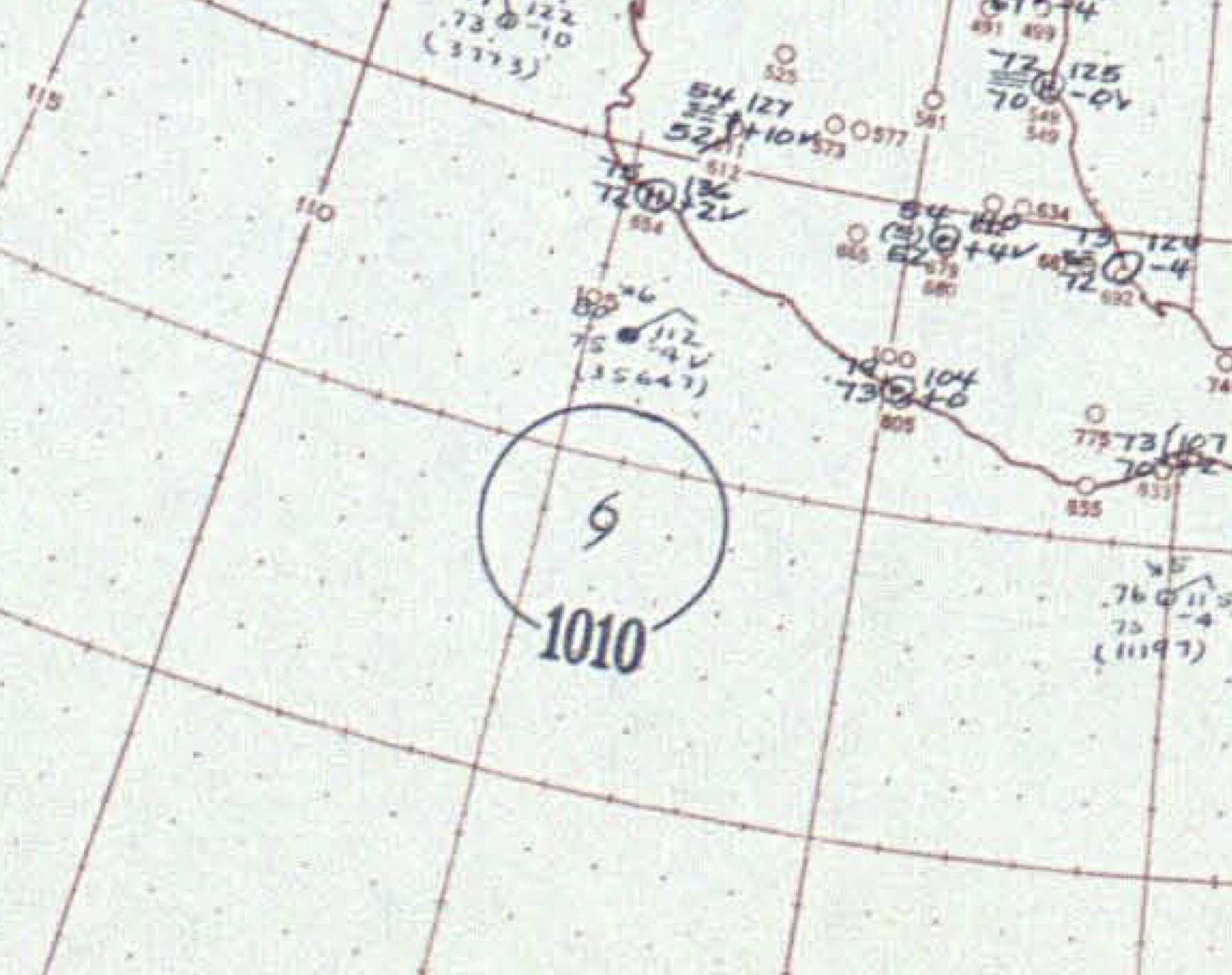
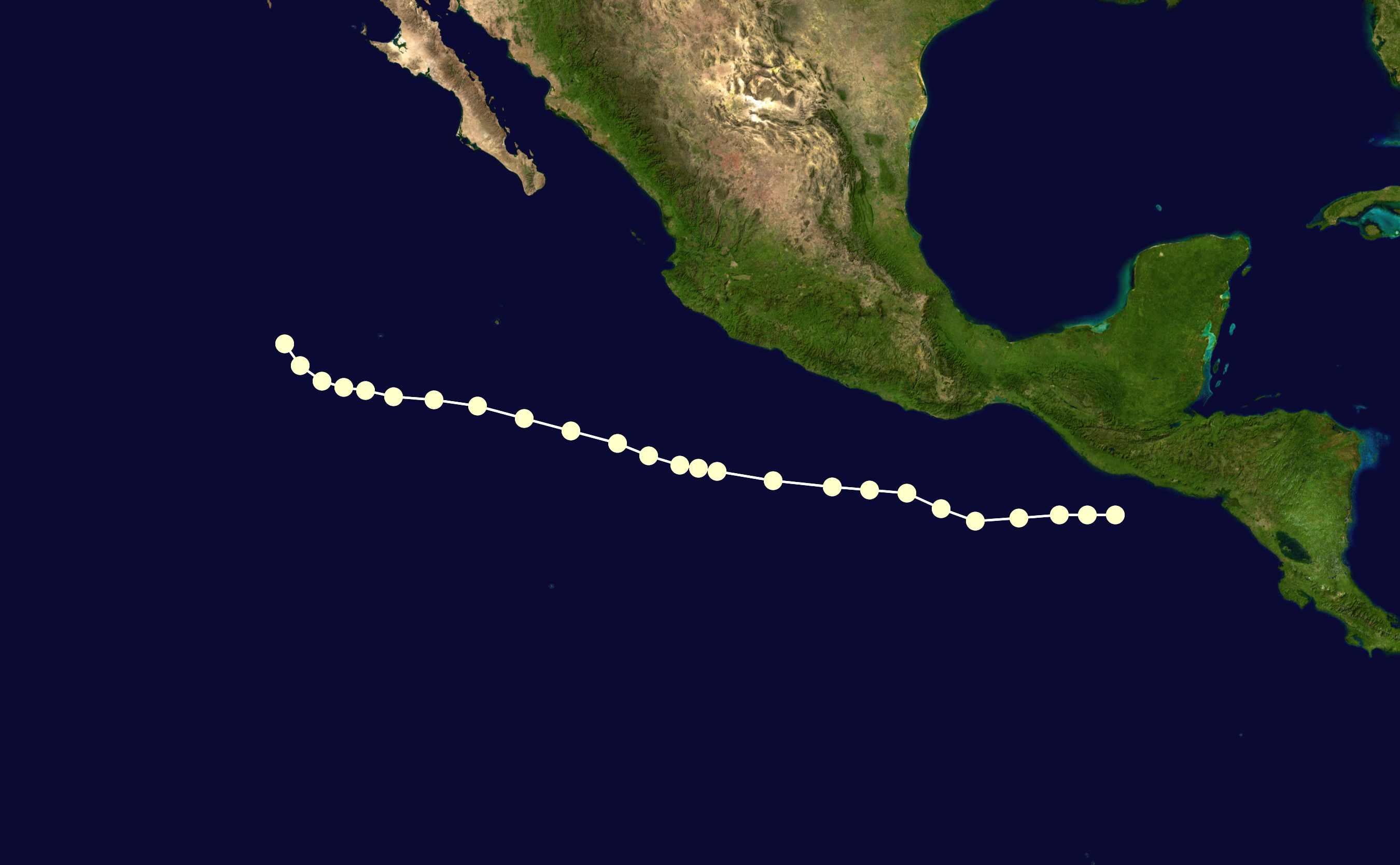
- Duration: October 26 – November 1
- Peak intensity: 85 mph (140 km/h) (1-min);

Hurricane Eleven existed from October 26 to November 1.

== See also ==
- 1954 Pacific typhoon season
- 1954 Atlantic hurricane season
- Australian region cyclone seasons: 1953–54 1954–55
- South Pacific cyclone seasons: 1953–54 1954–55
- South-West Indian Ocean cyclone seasons: 1953–54 1954–55
