= 1975 Pacific hurricane season =

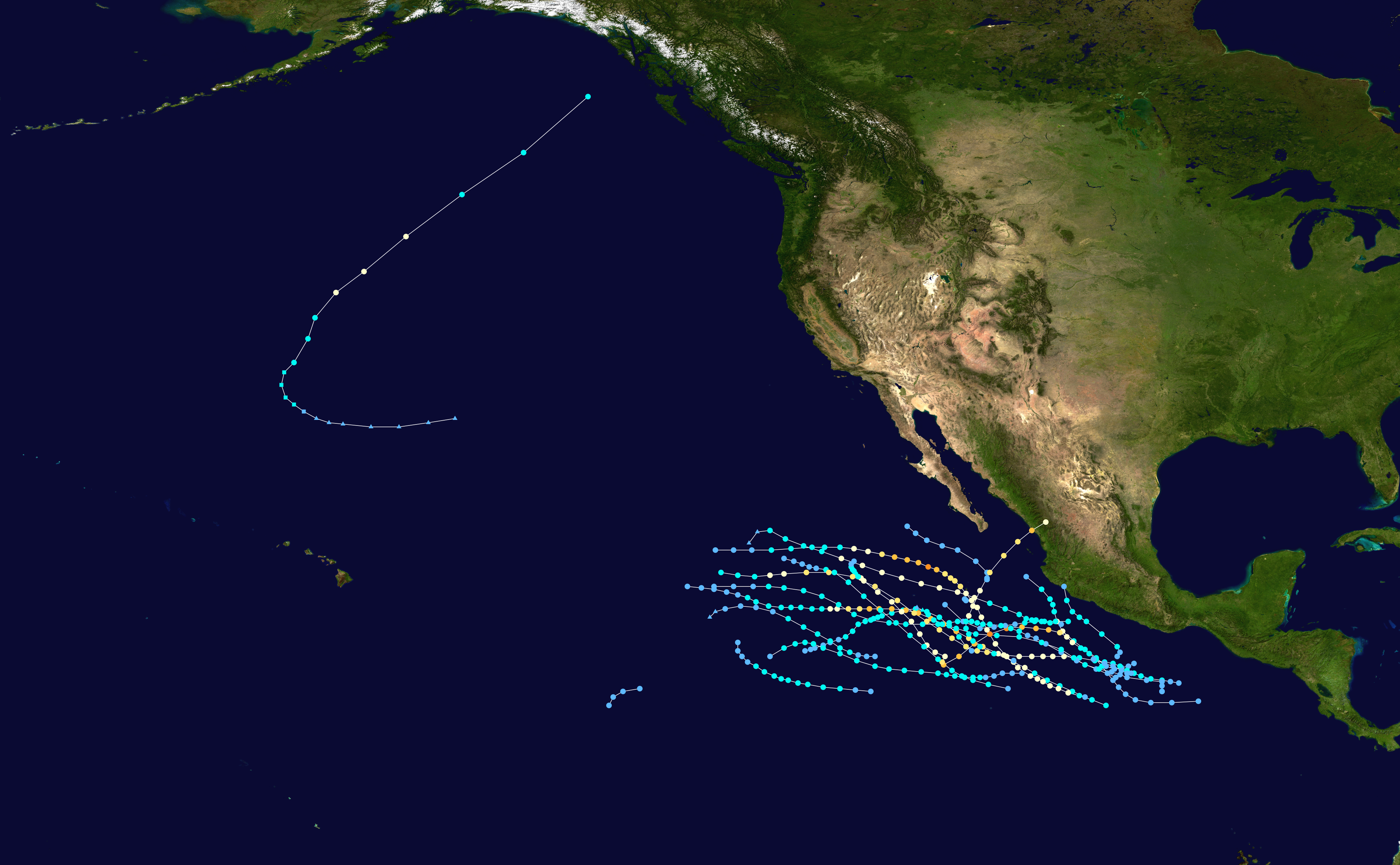
- Season summary map

Seasonal boundaries
- First system formed: June 2, 1975
- Last system dissipated: November 7, 1975

Strongest storm
- Name: Denise
  - Maximum winds: 140 mph (220 km/h) (1-minute sustained)
  - Lowest pressure: 934 mbar (hPa; 27.58 inHg)

Seasonal statistics
- Total depressions: 21
- Total storms: 17
- Hurricanes: 9
- Major hurricanes (Cat. 3+): 4
- Total fatalities: 30 total
- Total damage: $20 million (1975 USD)

Related articles
- 1975 Atlantic hurricane season; 1975 Pacific typhoon season; 1975 North Indian Ocean cyclone season

The 1975 Pacific hurricane season officially started May 15, 1975, in the eastern Pacific, and June 1, 1975, in the central Pacific, and lasted until November 30, 1975. These dates conventionally delimit the period of each year when most tropical cyclones form in the northeast Pacific Ocean.

The 1975 Pacific hurricane season was slightly above average, with 17 tropical storms forming. Of these, 9 became hurricanes, and 4 became major hurricanes by reaching Category 3 or higher on the Saffir-Simpson Hurricane Scale. The only notable storms are Hurricane Olivia, which killed 30 people, caused $30 million (1975 USD) in damage, and left thousands homeless when it made landfall in October; and an unnamed hurricane that developed at very high latitude, but had no effect on land. Hurricane Denise was the strongest storm of the year. Hurricanes Lily and Katrina passed close to Socorro Island and Tropical Storm Eleanor made landfall in Mexico. Hurricane Agatha sank a ship.

== Season summary ==
The season began with the formation of Tropical Depression One on June 2 and ended with the extratropical transition of Tropical Storm Priscilla on November 7. No named systems formed in May, two in June, four in July, six in August, three in September, one in October, and one in November. The total length of the season, from the formation of the first depression to the dissipation of the last, was 158 days.

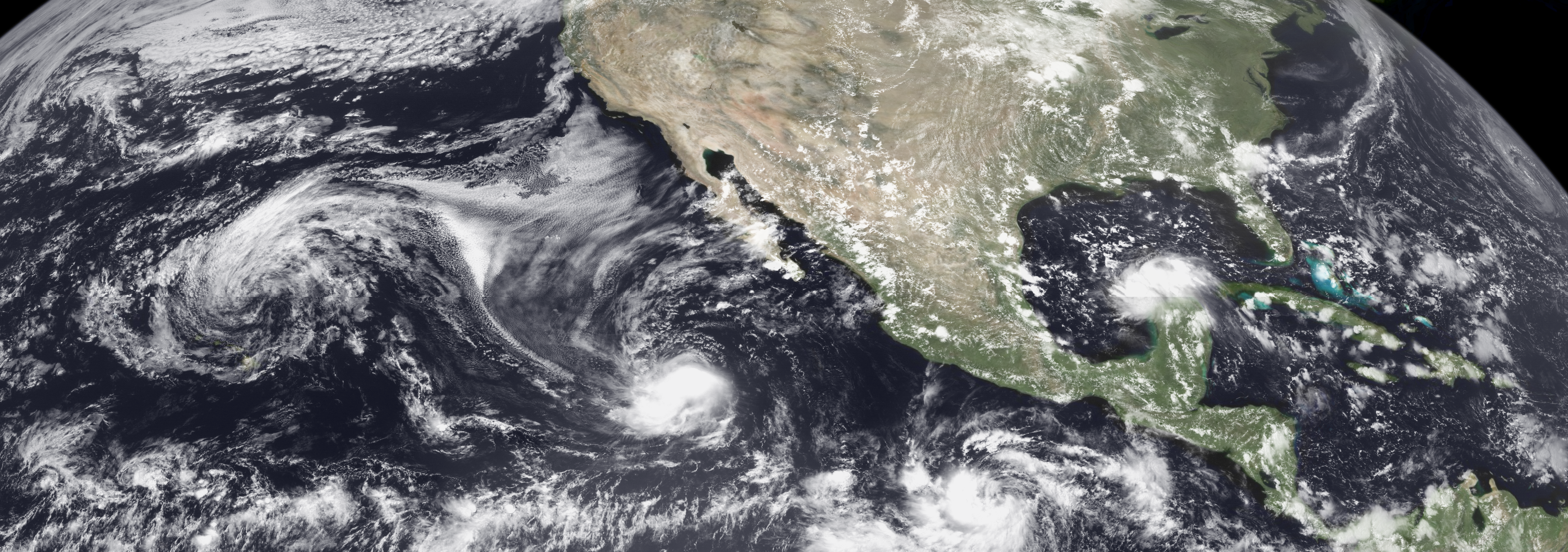
The remnants of Hurricane Ilsa (far left), Tropical Storm Jewel (center-left), two tropical depression that later became hurricanes Katrina (bottom-center) and Caroline (center-right) in the Gulf of Mexico, and Subtropical Storm Doris (far right) all simultaneously active on August 28

In the eastern Pacific (east of 140°W), sixteen tropical storms and eight hurricanes formed. Four of the hurricanes became major hurricanes by reaching Category 3 or higher on the Saffir-Simpson Hurricane Scale. These numbers are close to the long-term averages of fifteen tropical storms, nine hurricanes, and four major hurricanes. There were also four unnamed tropical depressions. The only system to enter or form in the central Pacific (between 140°W and the international dateline) was an unusual high-latitude hurricane (north of 30°N), which went unnamed. This was the first occurrence on record of a mid-Pacific upper tropospheric low developing into a tropical cyclone, and the first hurricane on record within the central Pacific north of Hawaii.

The only systems to make landfall this year were Tropical Storm Eleanor and Hurricane Olivia. Besides these two systems, Hurricane Agatha caused the sinking of a ship carrying millions of dollars' worth of cargo. Tropical Storm Eleanor caused no serious impact.

The most devastating storm of the season was Hurricane Olivia. A late-season major hurricane, Olivia came ashore near Mazatlán. The storm killed 30 people, left around 30,000 people homeless, and caused 20 million dollars (1975 USD) in damage.

== Systems ==
=== Hurricane Agatha ===
- Category 1 hurricane (SSHWS)
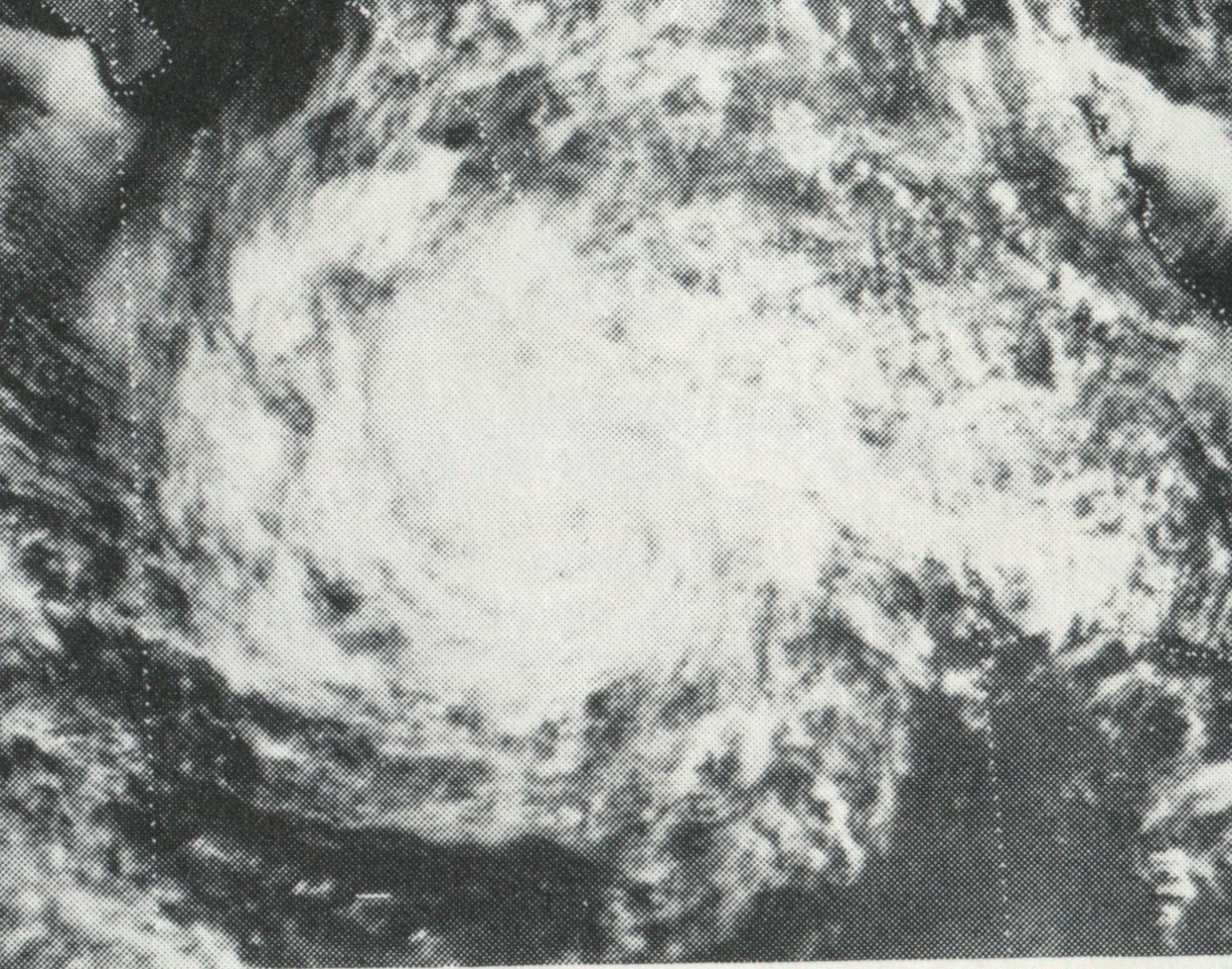
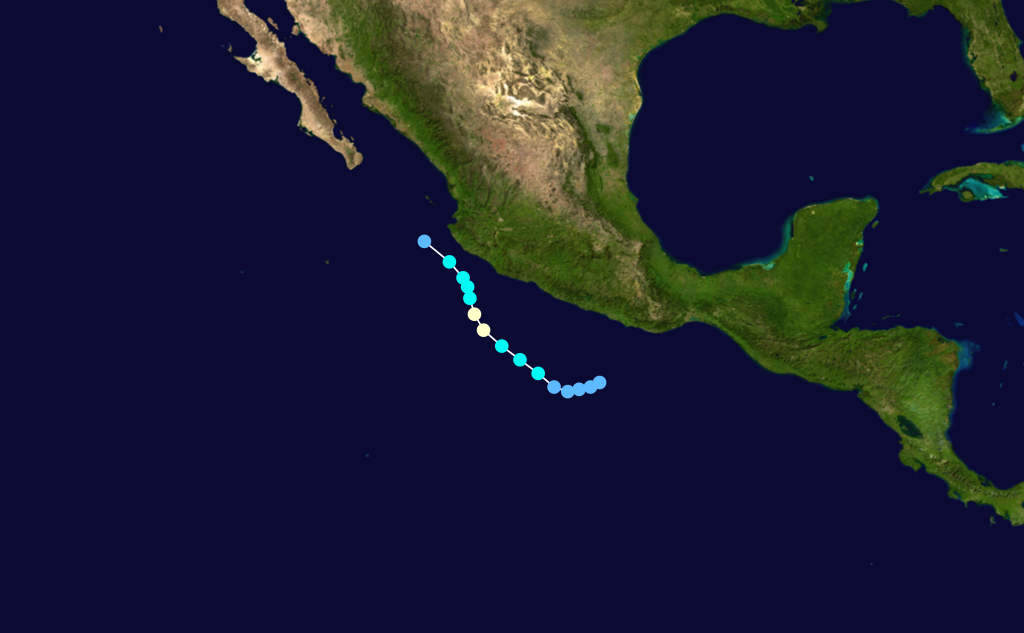
- Duration: June 2 – June 5
- Peak intensity: 80 mph (130 km/h) (1-min); ≤1005 mbar (hPa)

An area of disturbed weather about 290 mi (467 km) southwest of Acapulco formed on June 1. It organized into a tropical depression the next day. After heading southwestward, it turned to the northwest and strengthened into Tropical Storm Agatha on June 2. Agatha maintained its course and steadily intensified. It reached hurricane intensity on June 3 while located about 170 mi (270 km) southwest of Zihuatanejo. Hurricane Agatha started weakening thereafter, becoming a tropical storm on June 4 and a depression on June 5. It dissipated shortly afterwards. At this time, Agatha was located about 140 mi (230 km) south of the Tres Marias Islands.

Even though Agatha passed close to Mexico as it weakened, no impact is known to have been caused. Waves caused by Agatha did impact a ship called the Polynesian Diakan. A Greek freighter en route from Pago Pago to Terminal Island, California, the Polynesian Diakan began flooding on June 3, forcing the 32-man crew to abandon the vessel. The exact cause of the initial flooding was unknown, but was speculated to be primarily due to cargo shifting and not the weather. The crew was rescued by the United States Coast Guard. Three members required hospitalization. After being reached on June 6 by a tugboat in a salvage attempt, the vessel capsized and sank near San Clemente Island on June 7, taking its multimillion-dollar cargo of 71 containers of canned tuna with it. The reason for the sinking was unknown.

=== Tropical Storm Bridget ===
- Tropical storm (SSHWS)
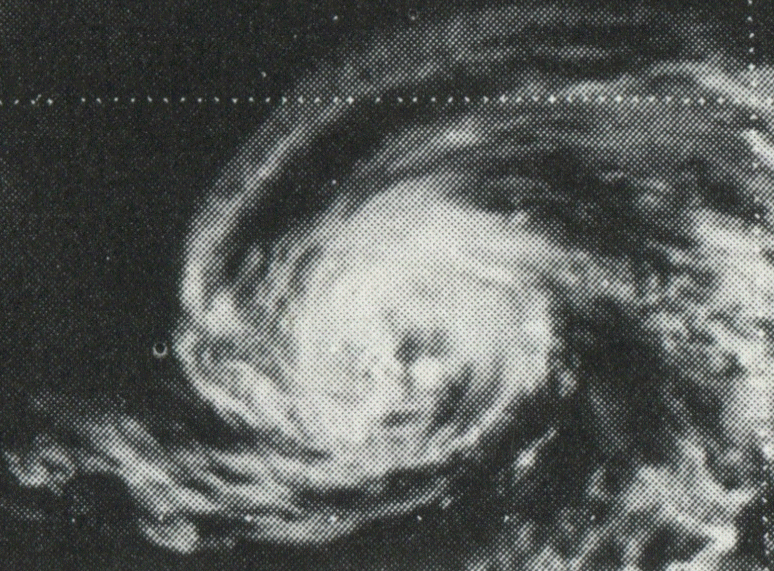
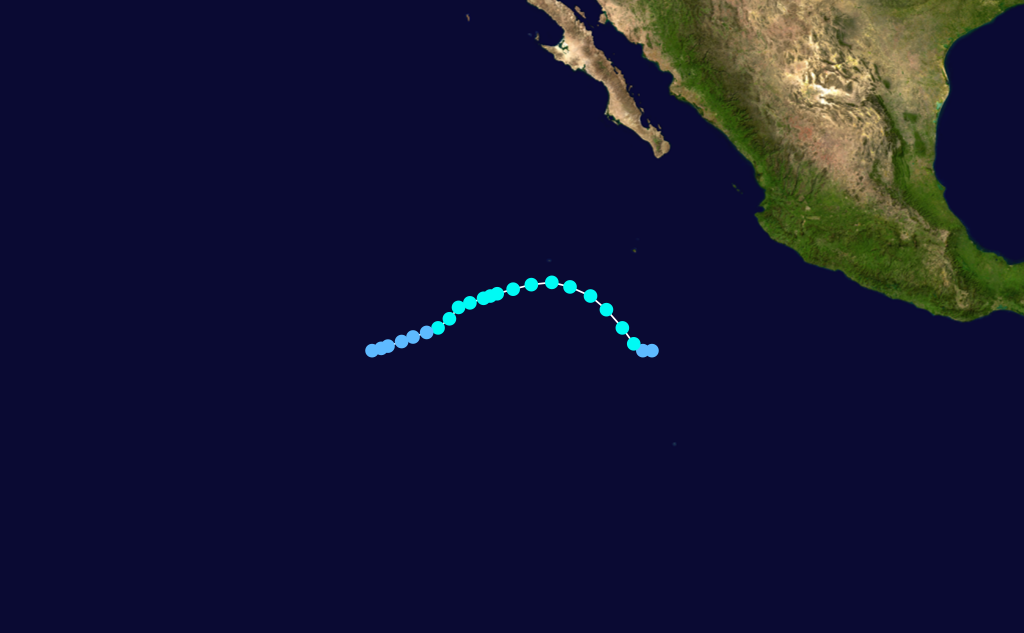
- Duration: June 28 – July 3
- Peak intensity: 65 mph (100 km/h) (1-min);

On June 27, a tropical depression formed about 575 mi (925 km) south of the tip of the Baja California Peninsula at a location atypical for tropical cyclogenesis. The depression moved generally westward, and intensified into Tropical Storm Bridget on June 28. It started accelerating as it turned towards the northwest, then west, and eventually to the southwest. Bridget weakened into a tropical depression on July 2 and dissipated the next day. It remnant circulation hung about in the area for a few more days. Bridget never came near land and thus, no deaths or damage were recorded.

=== Hurricane Carlotta ===
- Category 3 hurricane (SSHWS)
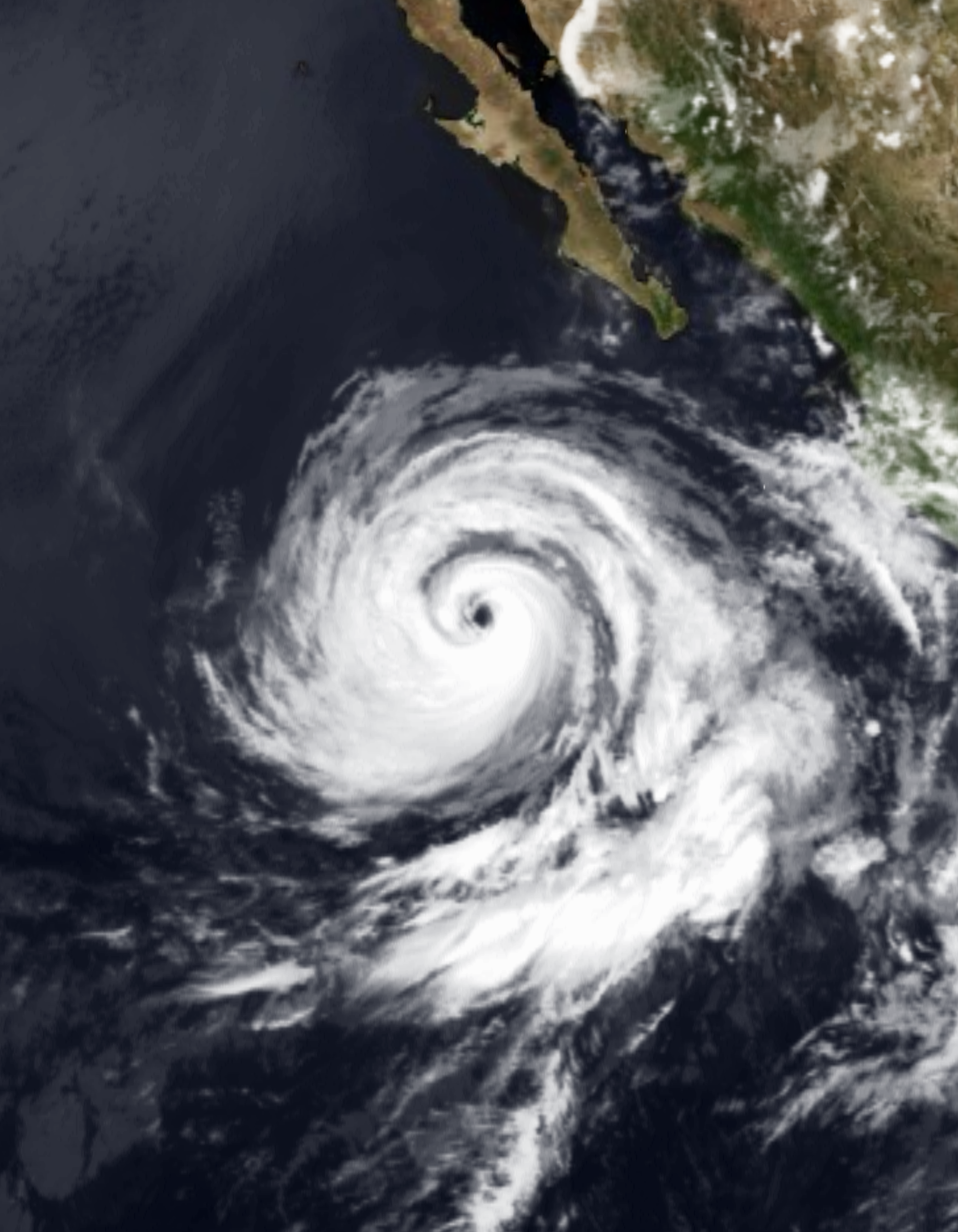
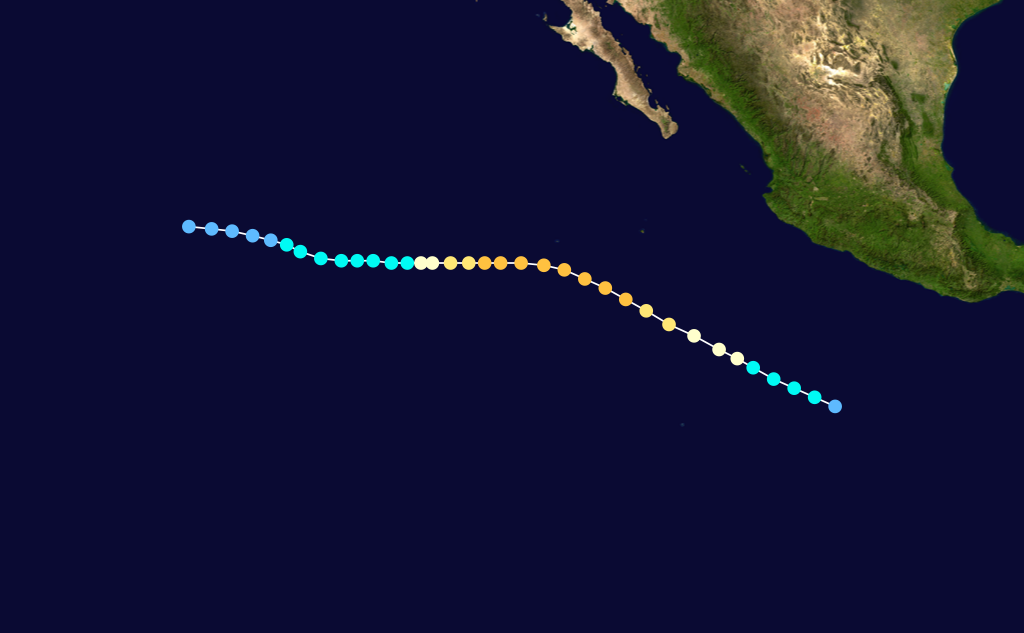
- Duration: July 2 – July 11
- Peak intensity: 125 mph (205 km/h) (1-min);

A disturbance 480 mi (772 km) south of Acapulco organized into a tropical depression on July 2. It headed generally west-northwest and steadily intensified, becoming a tropical storm later on July 2. It became a hurricane on July 3 and ultimately peaked as a Category 3 hurricane. Hurricane Carlotta was first major hurricane, Category 3 or higher, of the season. It began weakening thereafter, and was a tropical storm by July 8. Carlotta became a depression on July 10 and dissipated the next day. The hurricane did not come near land and caused no significant impact.

=== Hurricane Denise ===
- Category 4 hurricane (SSHWS)
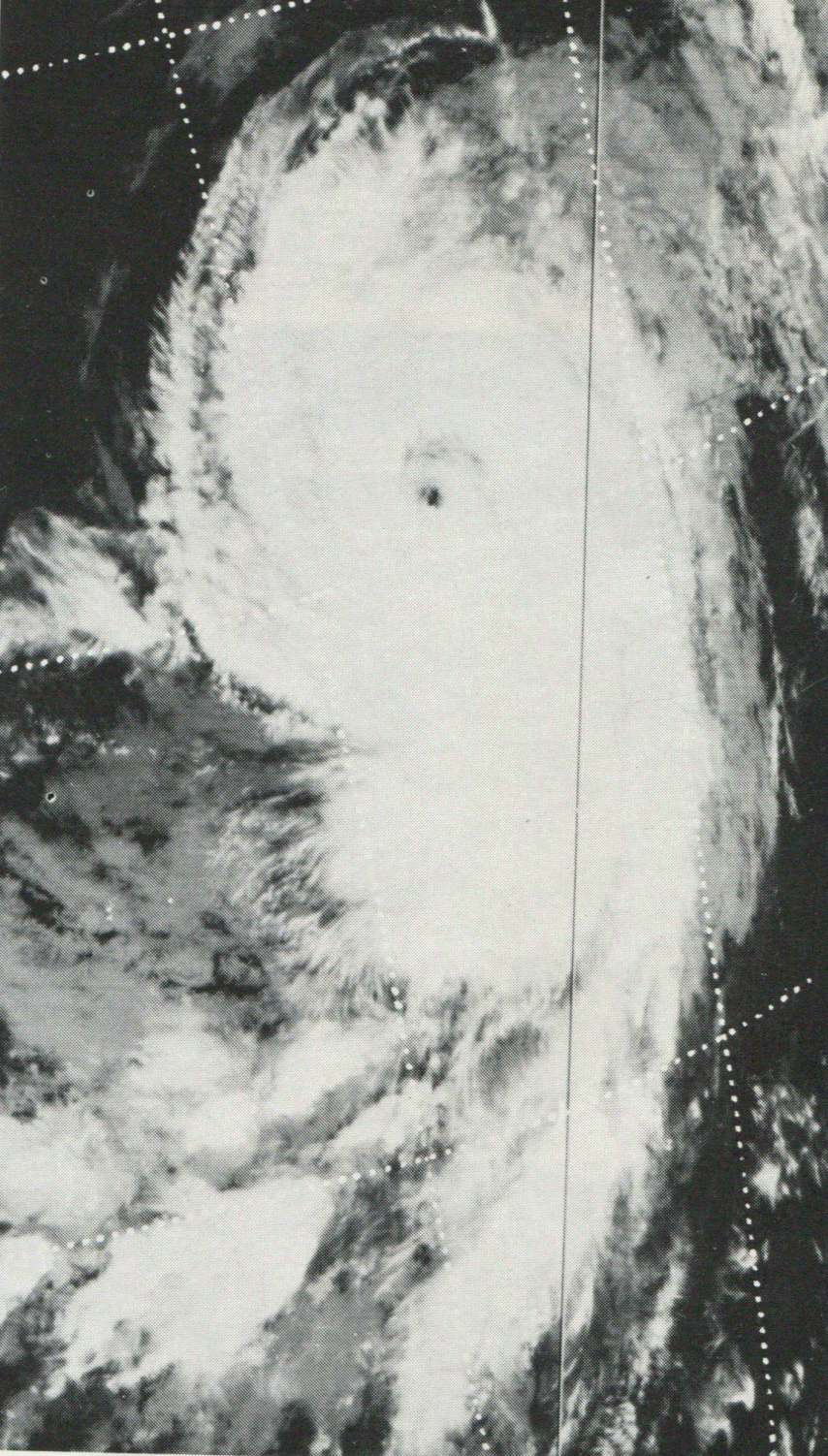
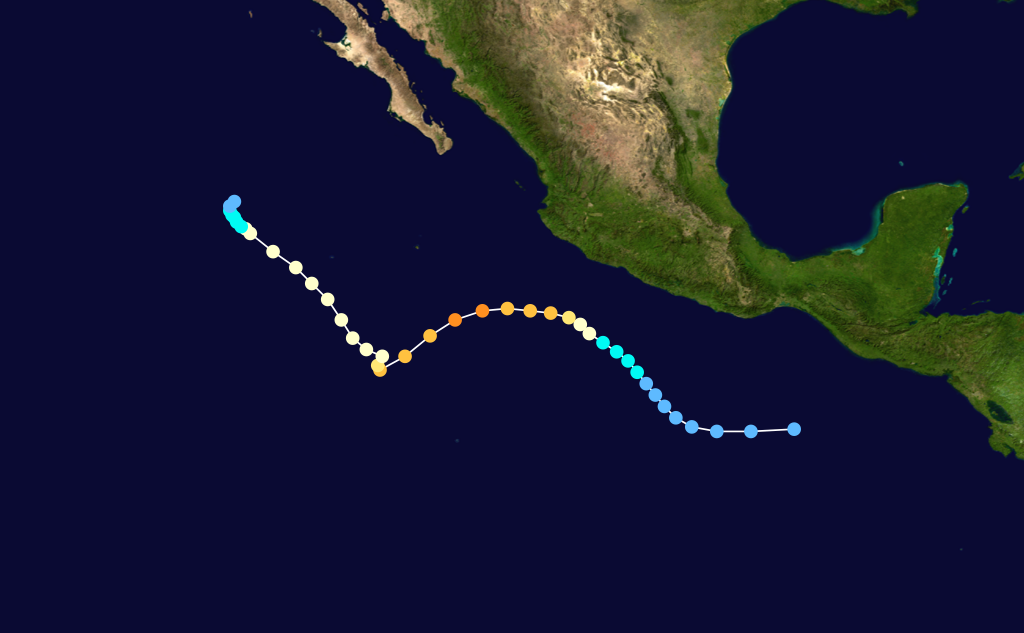
- Duration: July 5 – July 15
- Peak intensity: 140 mph (220 km/h) (1-min); 934 mbar (hPa)

An unstable area developed a circulation and became a tropical depression on July 4. It headed west- northwest and became a tropical storm on July 7. The next day, it was a hurricane and turned to the west. Continuing to strengthen, it reached Category 4 intensity on July 9. This windspeed was the highest of the season. The hurricane turned to the southwest and gradually weakened. By July 11 it was nearly stationary. It then headed northwestward again and continued weakening, becoming a tropical storm on July 13. It weakened into a depression on July 14 and dissipated immediately thereafter. Denise brought winds of near-gale force to parts of Mexico, but otherwise caused no damage or casualties.

=== Tropical Storm Eleanor ===
- Tropical storm (SSHWS)
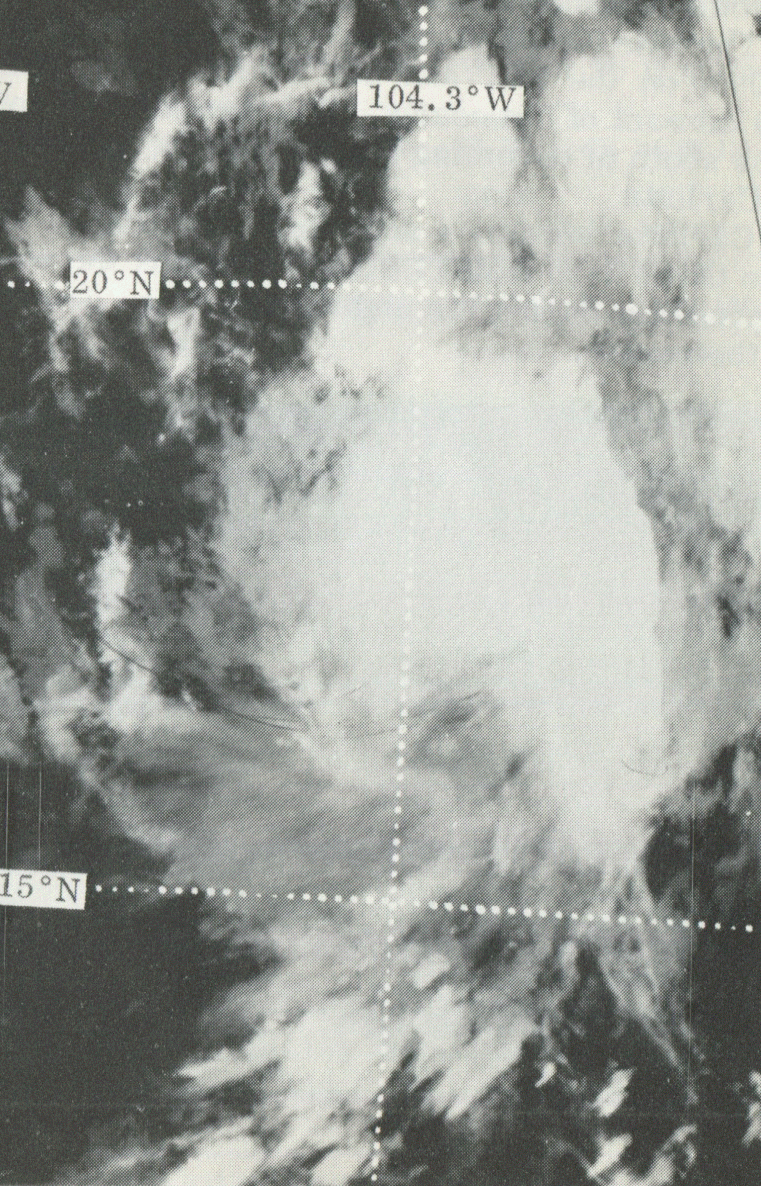
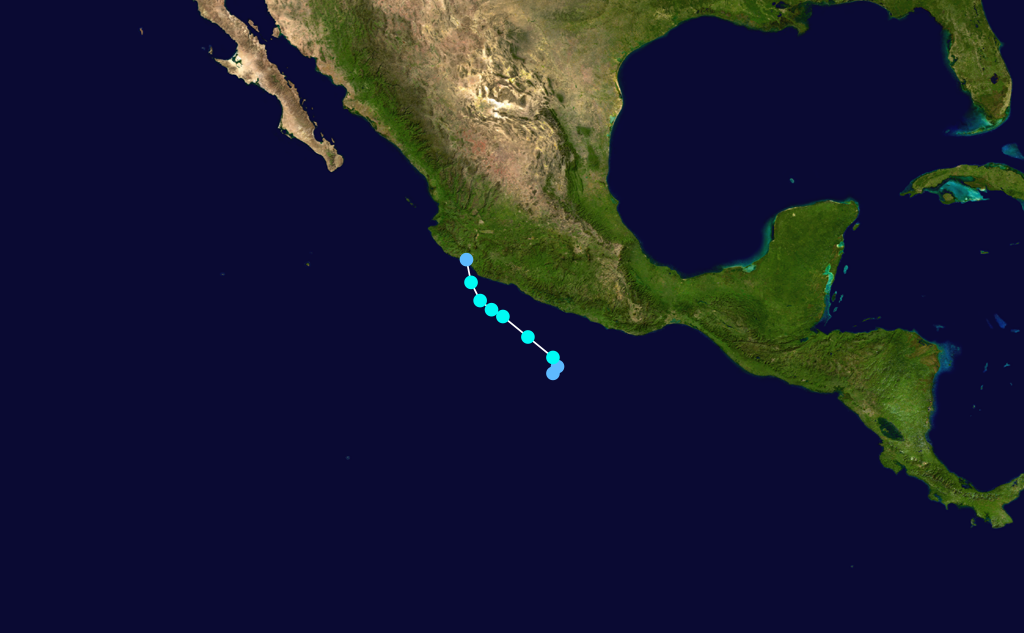
- Duration: July 10 – July 12
- Peak intensity: 40 mph (65 km/h) (1-min);

An area of disturbed weather developed into a tropical depression on July 10, 100 mi (160 km) south of Acapulco. As its center of circulation became more pronounced and it was upgraded into Tropical Storm Eleanor. The tropical storm moved northwestward, and later curved northward. The system made landfall near Manzanillo on July 12. It quickly dissipated. Eleanor brought 20 mph (32 km/h) winds the Manzanillo, but damage from the storm is minor due to the lack of heavy rains.

=== Tropical Storm Francene ===
- Tropical storm (SSHWS)
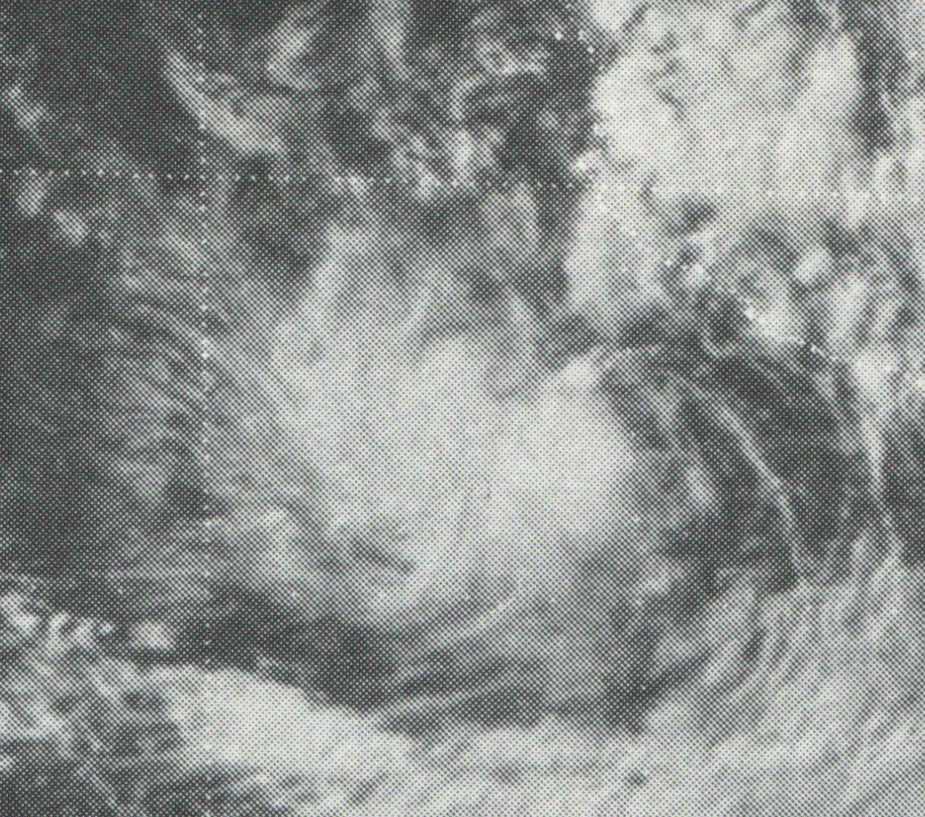
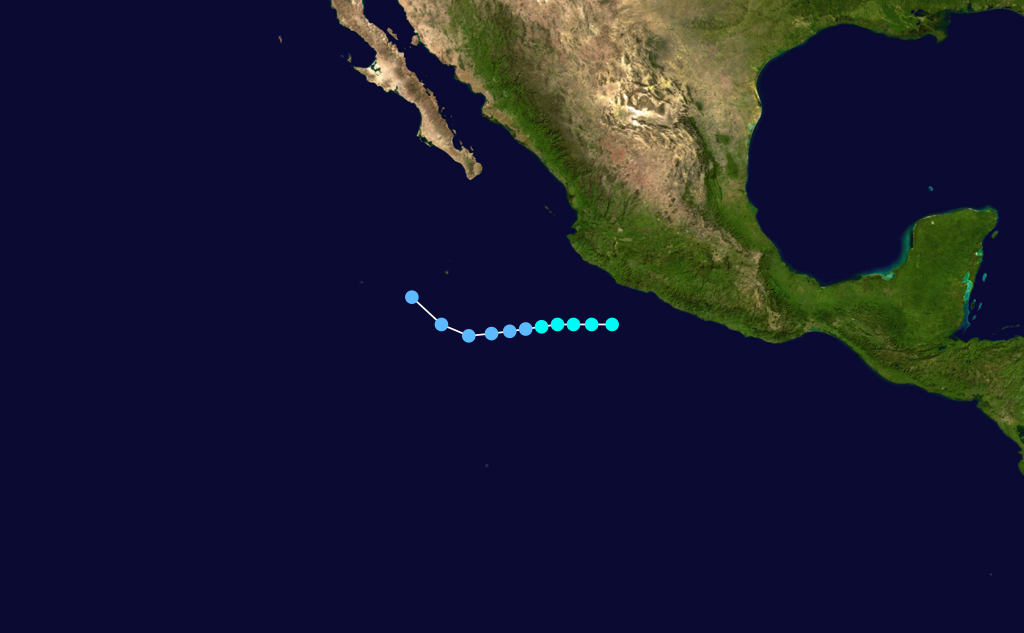
- Duration: July 27 – July 30
- Peak intensity: 50 mph (85 km/h) (1-min);

A rapidly moving squally area of disturbed weather that was moving on a northwestward path was upgraded into Tropical Depression Seven on July 27. It intensified into a tropical storm later that day. Francene turned to the west and weakened into a tropical depression on July 28. It slowly weakened and ceased to exist as a tropical cyclone on July 30. Francene's remnants persisted as a tropical disturbance for another twelve hours, before completely dissipating. This tropical cyclone caused no known impact.

=== Tropical Storm Georgette ===
- Tropical storm (SSHWS)
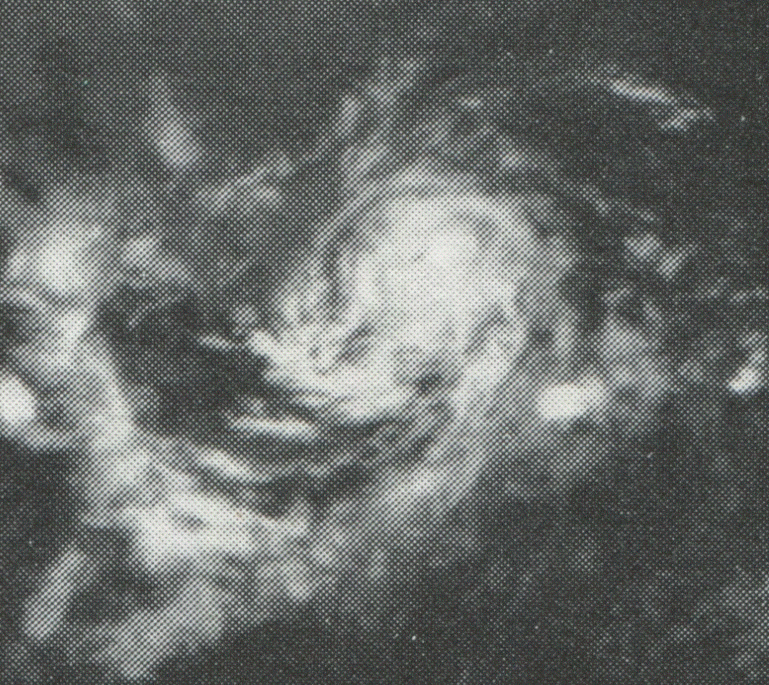
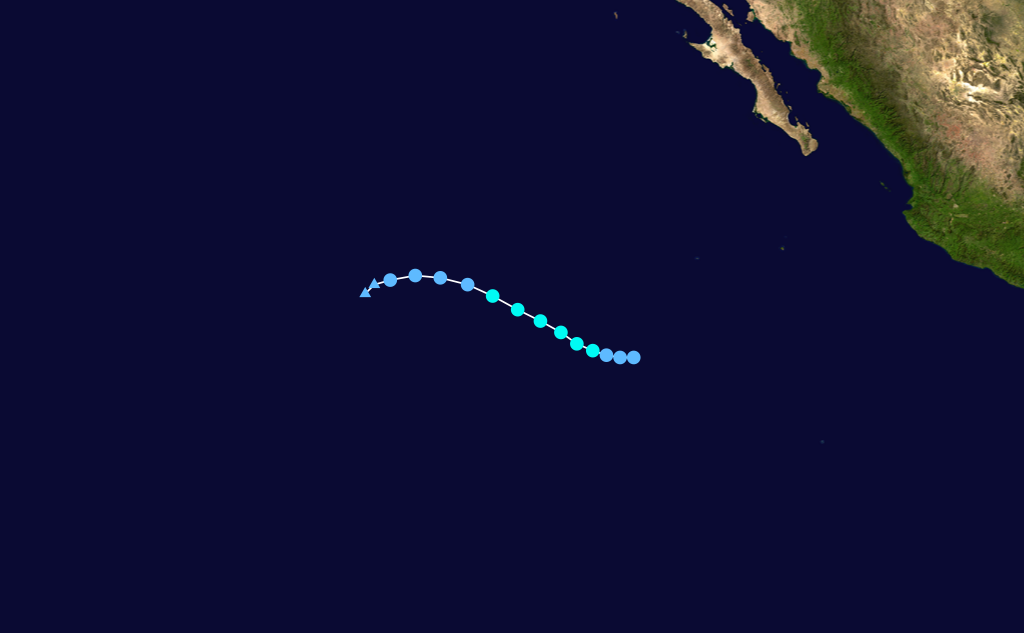
- Duration: August 11 – August 14
- Peak intensity: 45 mph (75 km/h) (1-min);

An area of disturbed weather about 800 mi (1,287 km) south-southwest of Cabo San Lucas organized a tropical depression on August 11. It was upgraded to tropical storm intensity the next day. After heading generally westward and peaking as a weak to moderate tropical storm on August 12, Georgette slowly weakened. It weakened into a depression on August 14 and underwent extratropical transition thereafter. The cyclone dissipated twelve hours later. Tropical Storm Georgette had no impact on land.

=== Tropical Storm Hilary ===
- Tropical storm (SSHWS)
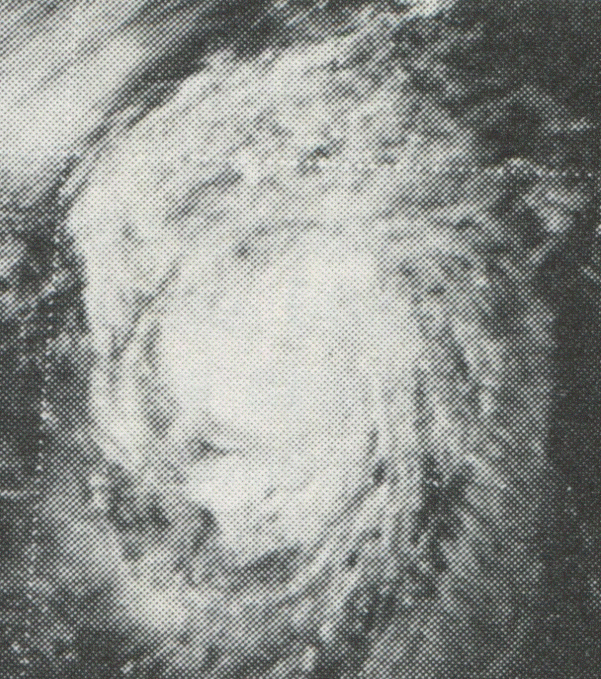
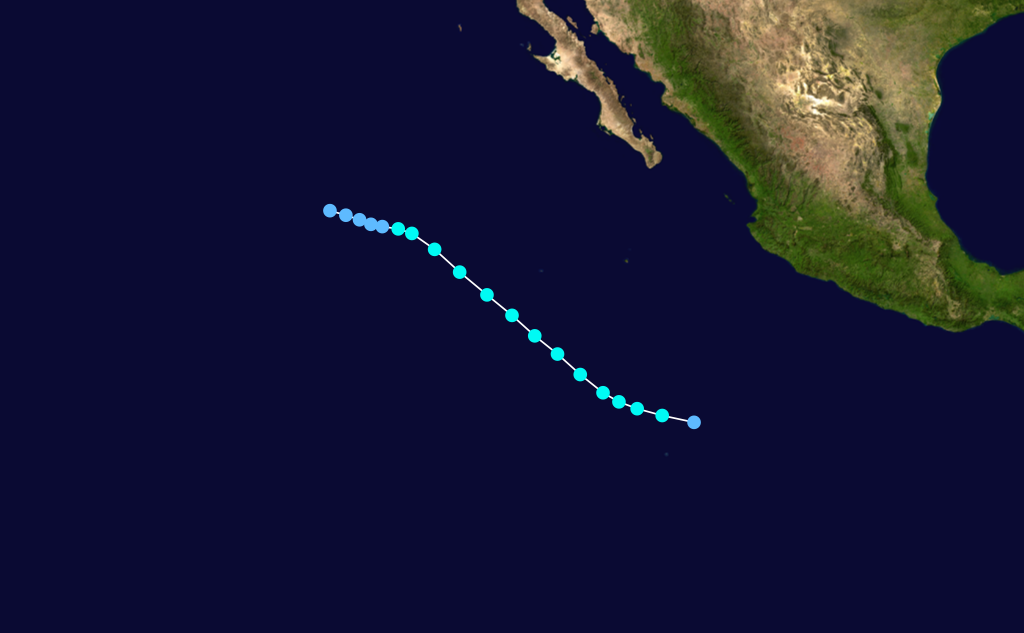
- Duration: August 13 – August 17
- Peak intensity: 60 mph (95 km/h) (1-min);

A tropical disturbance formed on August 11 and gradually organized. The next day, an atmospheric circulation developed. Based on this, this system was classified as Tropical Depression Nine on August 13. The depression quickly intensified into a tropical storm and was named Hilary. The system gradually accelerated to the northwest and reached its peak strength on August 15 with winds of 60 mph (95 km/h). Tropical Storm Hilary then started a gradual weakening trend. It became a depression on August 16, turned a little bit more westward, and dissipated on August 17. Hilary never came near land, and as such caused no death or damage.

=== Hurricane Ilsa ===
- Category 2 hurricane (SSHWS)
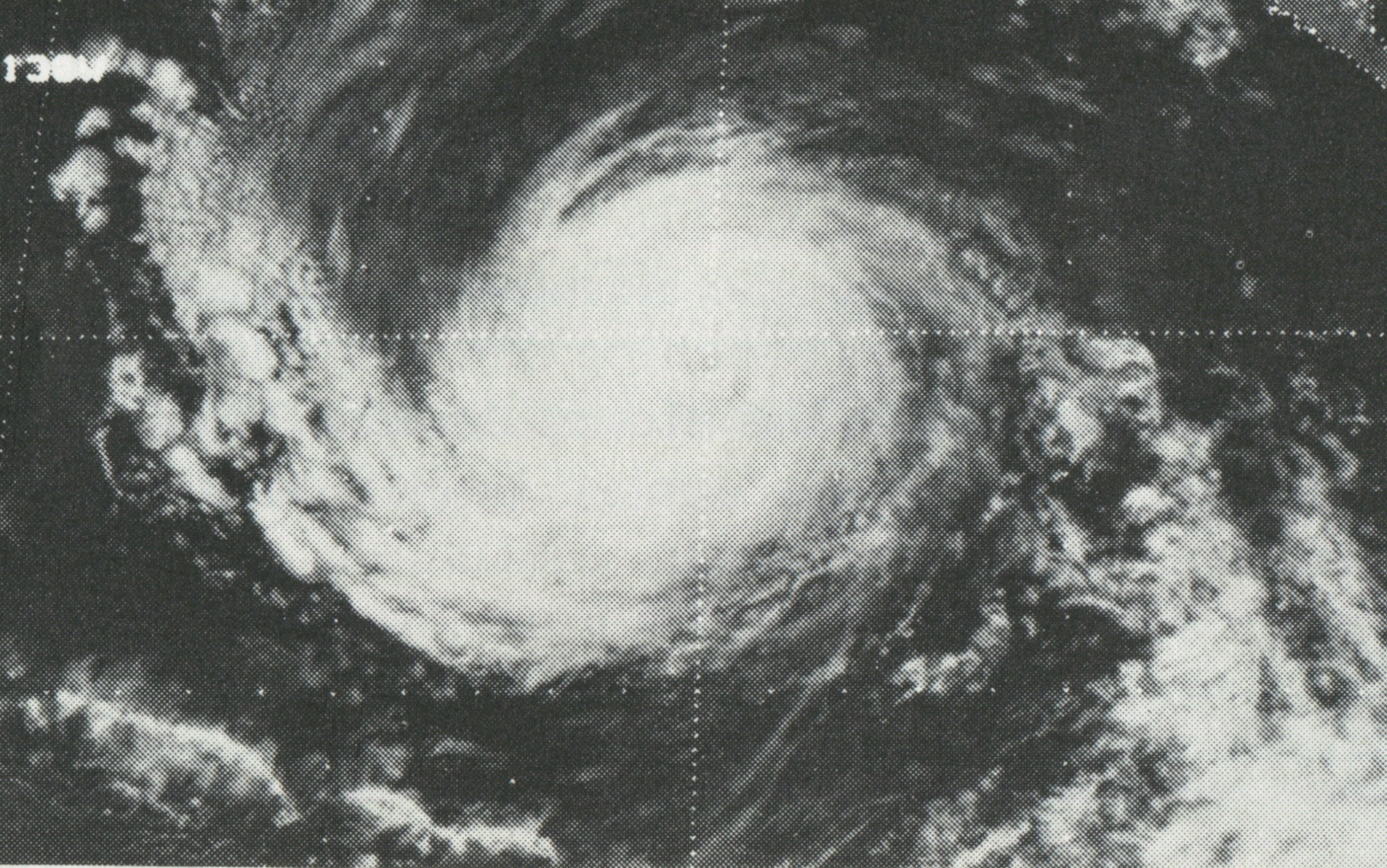
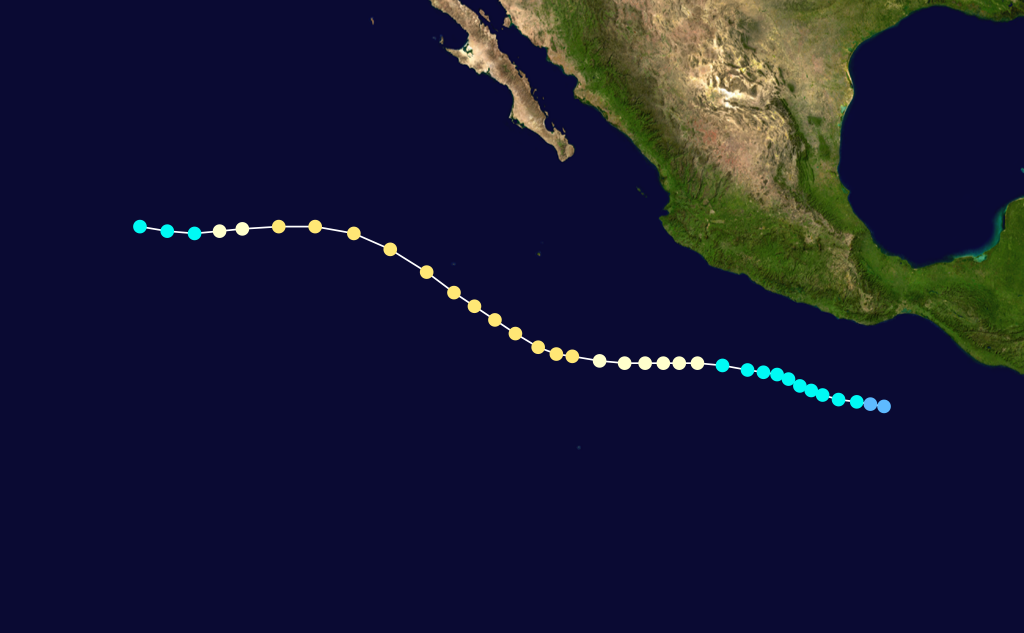
- Duration: August 18 – August 26
- Peak intensity: 105 mph (165 km/h) (1-min);

On August 18, a tropical depression formed south of the Gulf of Tehuantepec from a tropical wave that had entered the Pacific Ocean from the Atlantic Ocean. It strengthened into a tropical storm later that day. The tropical storm moved westward, and became a hurricane on August 21. Ilsa became a Category 2 hurricane on August 22. It maintained that intensity for three days as it moved out to sea. On August 25, Ilsa turned westward and rapidly weakened. It fell to tropical storm intensity on August 26. Later that day, while still maintaining winds of gale-force, Ilsa ceased being a tropical cyclone. Ilsa's remnants continued out over the open Pacific Ocean. The remains of Ilsa eventually interacted with another weather system. That triggered the development of the unnamed hurricane of August 31–September 5

Hurricane Ilsa caused no casualties or damage. As the unnamed hurricane formed from Ilsa's remnants, Ilsa and the latter system are unofficially the same tropical cyclone. Indeed, this year's seasonal report from the Redwood City Eastern Pacific Hurricane Center, in the Monthly Weather Review includes a brief discussion of the unnamed hurricane in the report's section on Hurricane Ilsa. Neither the Central Pacific Hurricane Center nor the official HURDAT "best track" database of tropical cyclone location and intensity data explicitly considers them the same. Hence, as far as official records matter, Ilsa and the unnamed hurricane of August 31 – September 5 are different tropical cyclones.

=== Hurricane Jewel ===
- Category 1 hurricane (SSHWS)
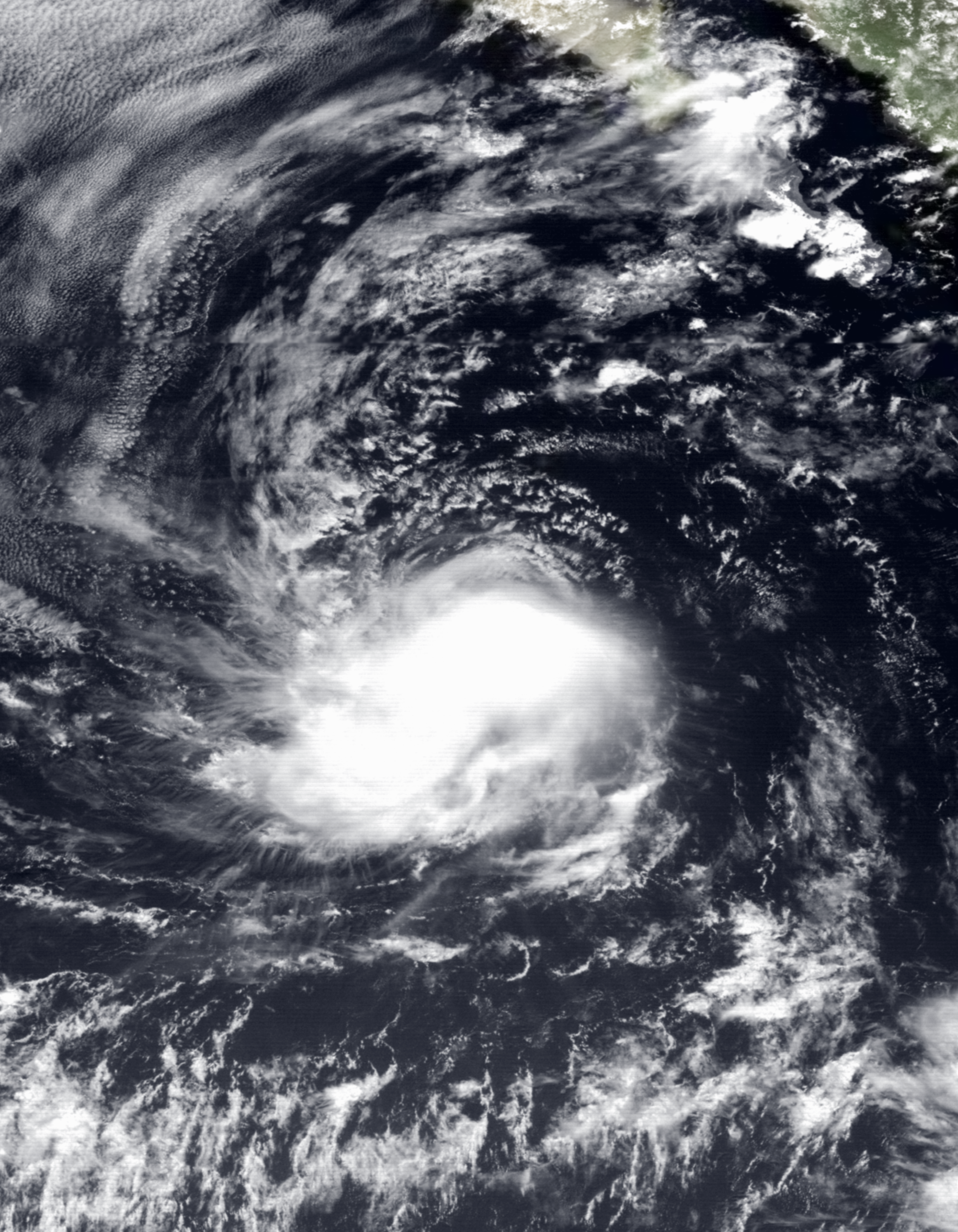
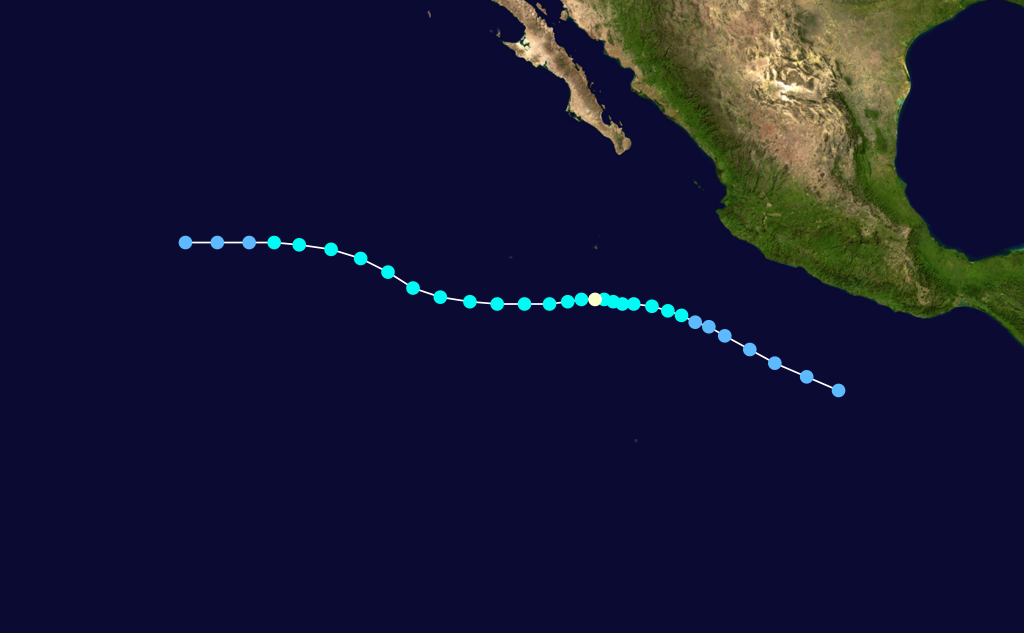
- Duration: August 24 – August 31
- Peak intensity: 75 mph (120 km/h) (1-min);

On August 24, a tropical depression formed from a tropical disturbance about 250 mi (400 km) south of Acapulco. It intensified into Tropical Storm Jewel the next day. The tropical cyclone headed generally northwest and paralleled the coast of Mexico. On August 27, Jewel became a hurricane for mere six hours, the minimum possible time in HURDAT. Jewel then turned to the west, and then back to the northwest. Jewel weakened to depression strength on August 31. Tropical Depression Jewel dissipated shortly after that, although its remnants remained distinct until September 3. There was no impact.

=== Hurricane Katrina ===
- Category 4 hurricane (SSHWS)
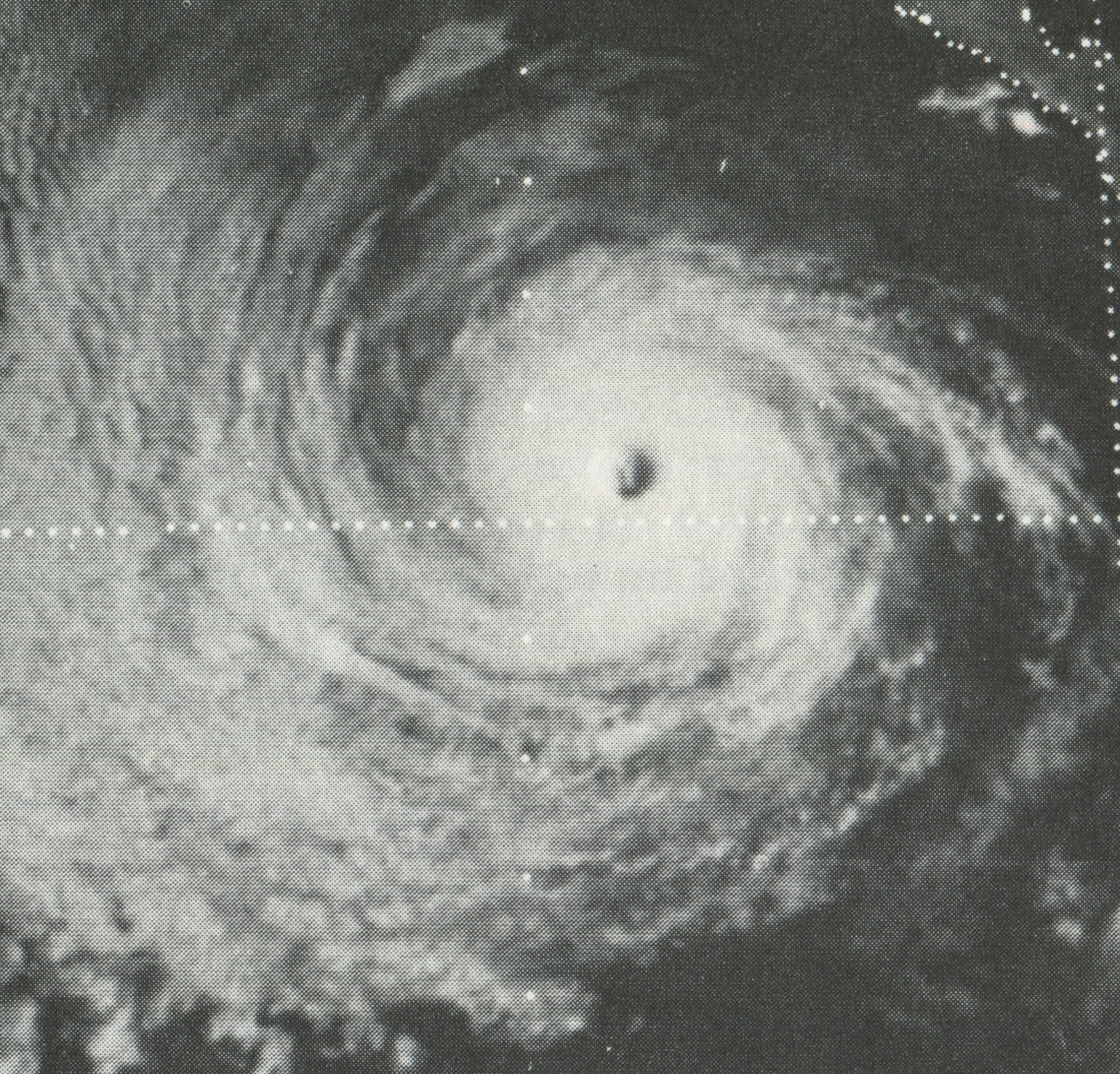
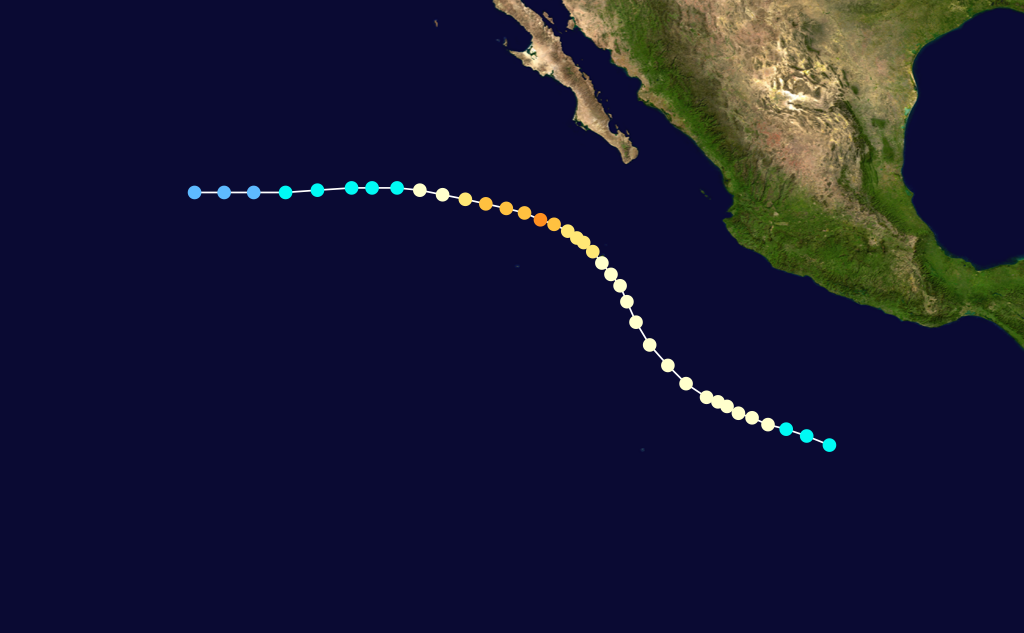
- Duration: August 29 – September 7
- Peak intensity: 130 mph (215 km/h) (1-min);

On August 29, an area of weather developed directly into a tropical storm, skipping the tropical depression stage. Katrina steadily intensified as it headed west-northwest, gradually turning to the northwest. It peaked in intensity on September 3 as a Category 4 hurricane with winds of 130 mph (209 km/h), the second highest of the season. Katrina then headed westward and rapidly weakened. It was downgraded into a tropical storm on September 5 and a depression on September 6. The last advisory was issued on September 7 when Katrina dissipated. Although the hurricane brought Category 3-equivalent winds to Socorro Island on September 2, no damage was reported there or anywhere else.

=== Unnamed hurricane ===
- Category 1 hurricane (SSHWS)
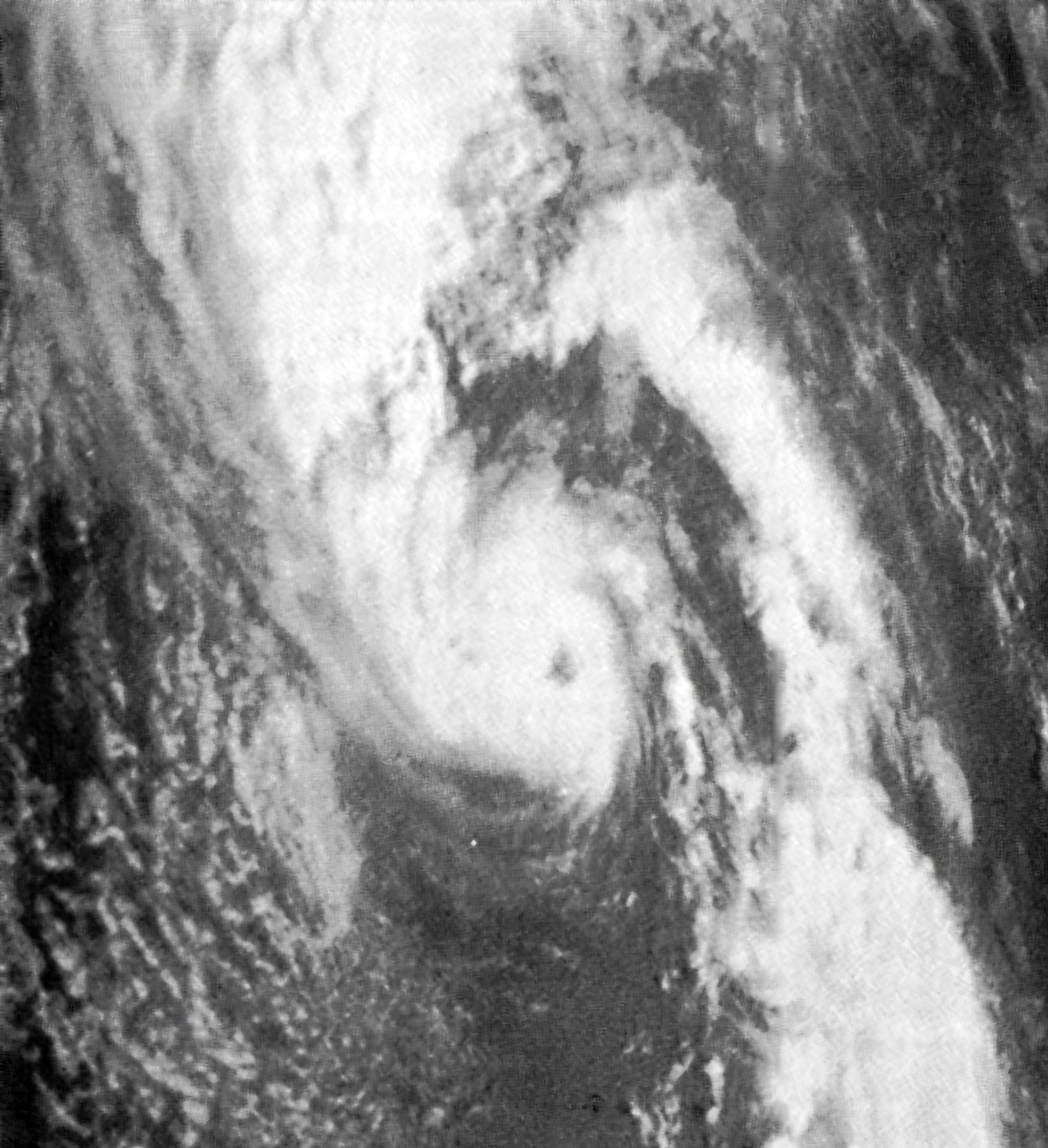
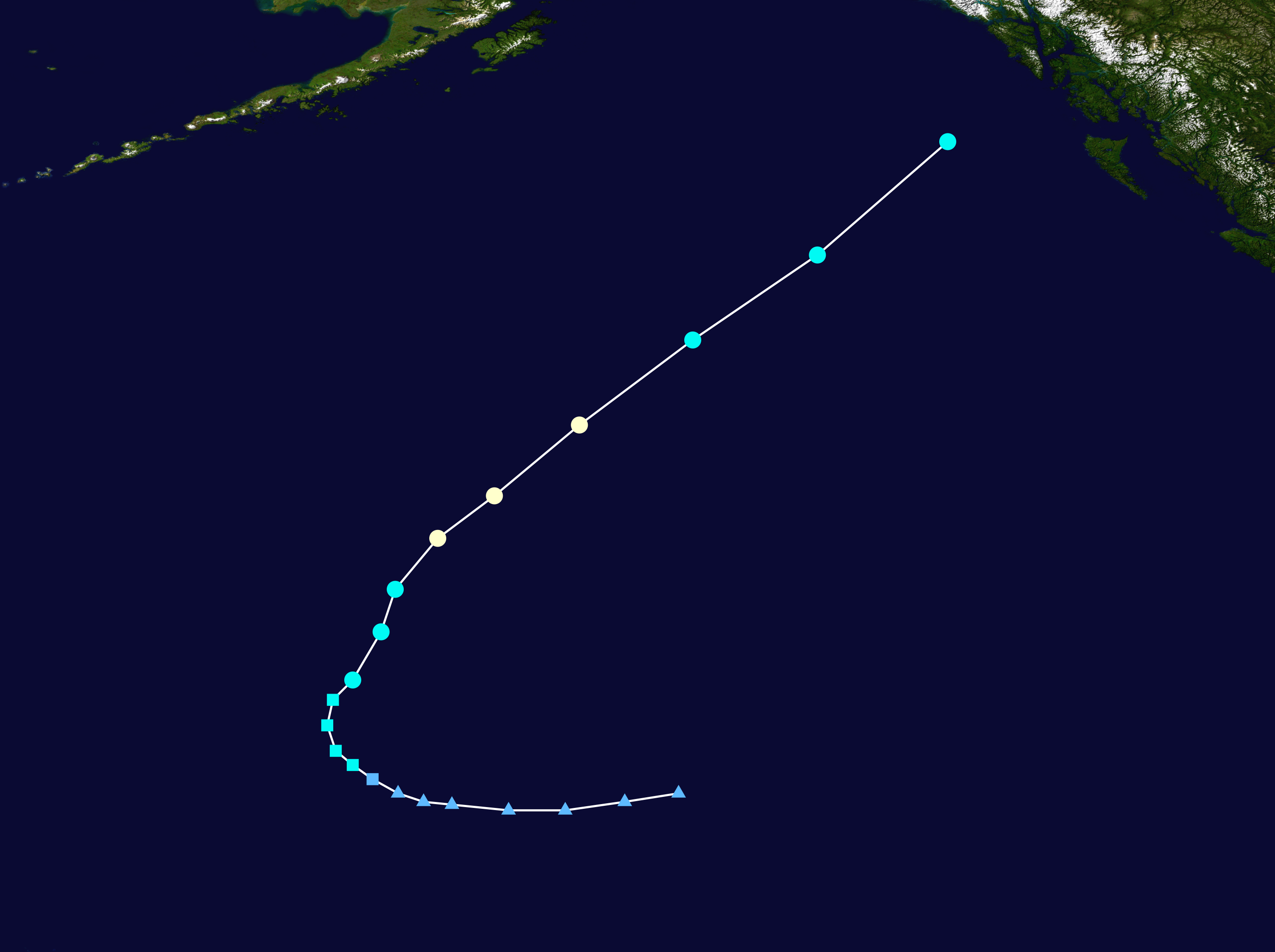
- Duration: August 31 – September 5
- Peak intensity: 75 mph (120 km/h) (1-min); 990 mbar (hPa)

The remnants of Hurricane Ilsa interacted with a mid-level trough to produce a new low-level circulation on August 31, about 930 miles (1,500 km) northeast of Hawaii. The new system absorbed the remnants of Ilsa as it moved westward. Thunderstorms increased around the low, resembling a subtropical cyclone by September 1. Its track over warmer waters caused the storm to transition into a tropical storm on September 2, by which time the convection organized into rainbands. By that time, the storm was about 685 miles (1,102 km) north of the Hawaiian island of Kauai. The storm quickly developed a central dense overcast, and by 00:00 UTC on September 3 Dvorak classifications began on the cyclone. An approaching cold front turned the storm to the north and northeast. Around that time, the storm developed an eye in the center of the convection, suggesting that it intensified into a hurricane late on September 3, located about 1,170 miles (1,885 km) south of Alaska. It was a small system, measuring about 85 miles (140 km) in diameter. A nearby ship reported sustained winds of 63 mph (102 km/h), while another nearby ship reported a pressure of 1003 mbar (29.6 inHg), with a 3-hour tendency increase of 13.5 mbar (0.40 inHg), suggesting a minimum pressure of under 990 mbar (29 inHg). After maintaining hurricane status for about 18 hours, the storm weakened due to strong wind shear from the approaching cold front. Early on September 5, the cyclone became extratropical in the Gulf of Alaska, while located about 315 miles (510 km) southwest of Juneau, Alaska. On the same day, the circulation was rapidly absorbed by the frontal system, and the remnants quickly reached the coast of British Columbia. The remnants of the storm turned southeastward, and the low was last tracked definitively to a point north of Montana.

=== Hurricane Lily ===
- Category 1 hurricane (SSHWS)
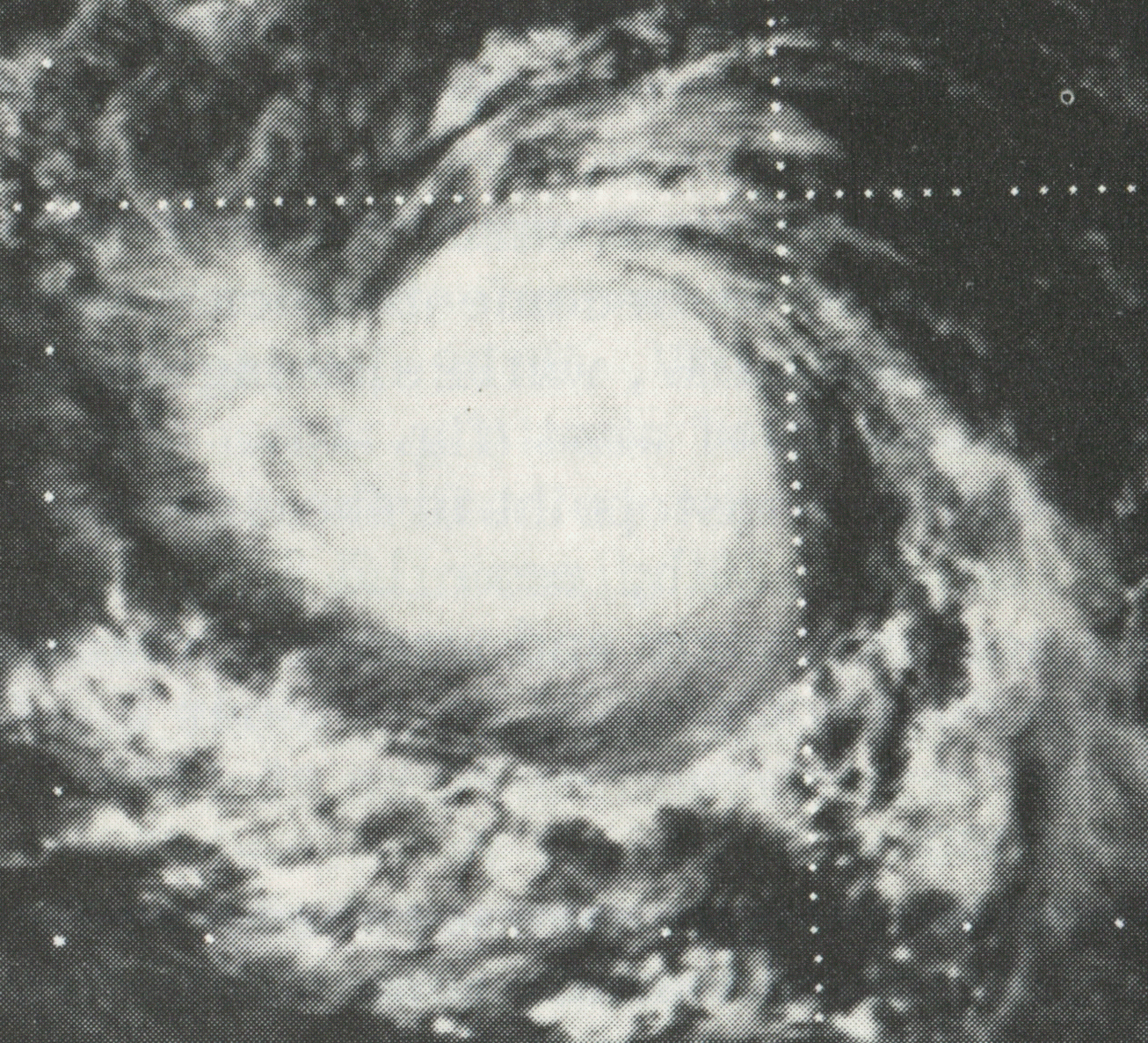
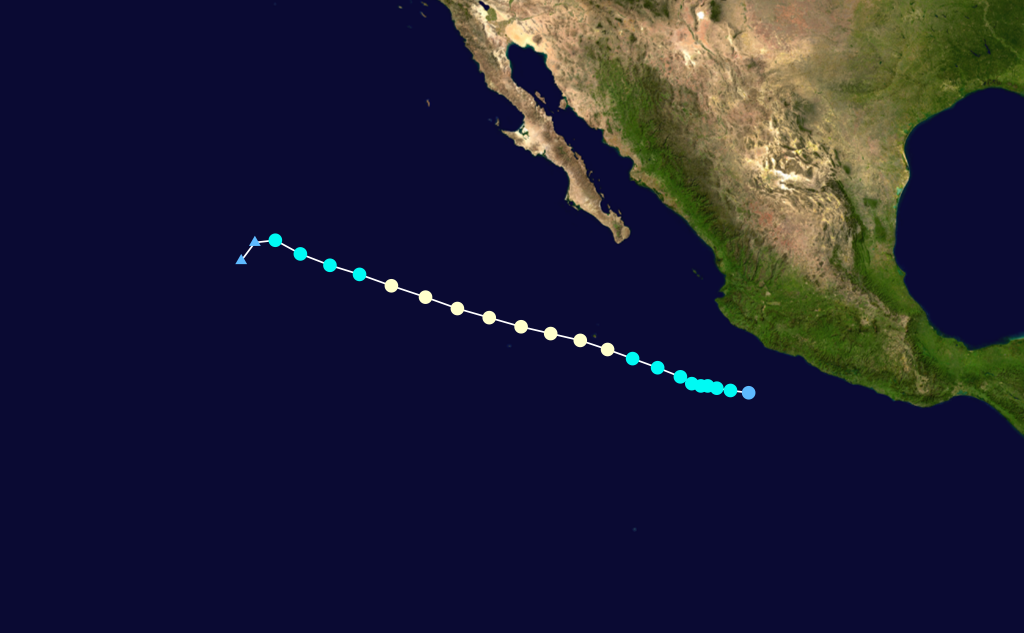
- Duration: September 16 – September 21
- Peak intensity: 85 mph (140 km/h) (1-min);

Rain and wind reports from the Acapulco weather station suggested that a tropical depression was developing. This was confirmed on September 16 from ship reports. It intensified into a tropical storm and was named Lily. Tropical Storm Lily headed northwest in a nearly straight path. By 0000 UTC September 18, the system was a moderate tropical storm located about 160 mi (260 km) south of Manzanillo Lily was upgraded to hurricane status on the same day and eventually reached its peak strength. After passing southwest of Socorro Island, Lily weakened, becoming a storm on September 20. Lily weakened into a depression on September 21, turned to the west-southwest, and dissipated. Its remnants remained visible until September 24, when they were no longer distinct via weather satellite. On September 19, the cyclone brought hurricane-force winds to Socorro Island. No damage or casualties were reported.

=== Tropical Storm Monica ===
- Tropical storm (SSHWS)
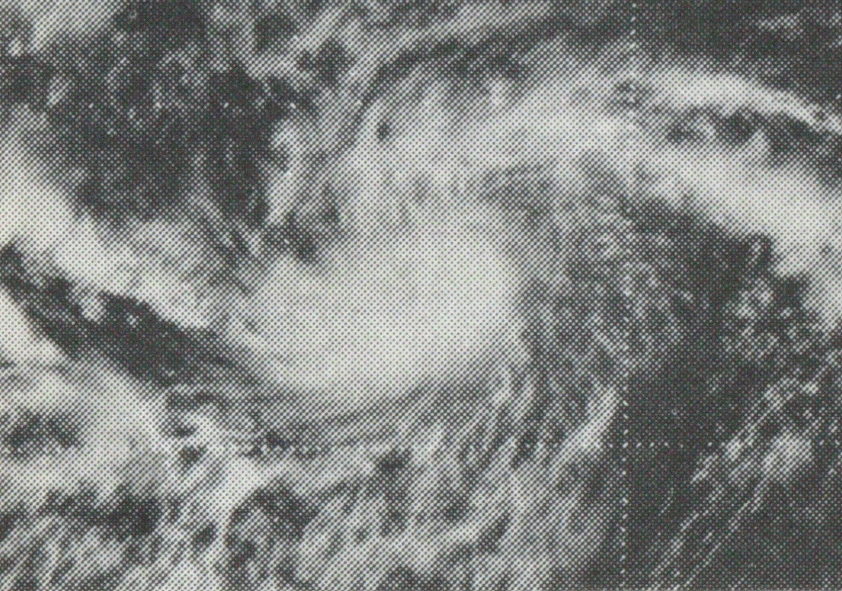
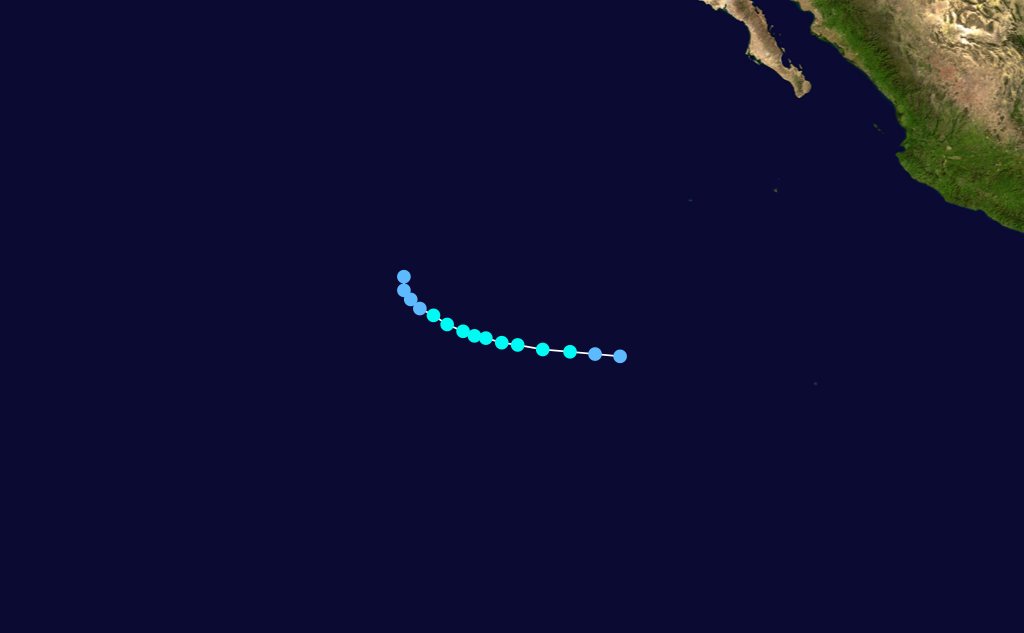
- Duration: September 28 – October 2
- Peak intensity: 50 mph (85 km/h) (1-min);

In late September, three tropical disturbances moved westward across the eastern Pacific Ocean. One of them organized into a tropical depression on September 28. The next day the depression was upgraded to Tropical Storm Monica. The tropical storm initially headed west-northwestward and gradually curved towards the north. It reached its peak intensity of 50 mph (85 km/h) on September 29. Monica then gradually weakened. It became a tropical depression on October 1. The cyclone dissipated shortly thereafter. No impact was reported in association with Tropical Storm Monica.

=== Tropical Storm Nanette ===
- Tropical storm (SSHWS)
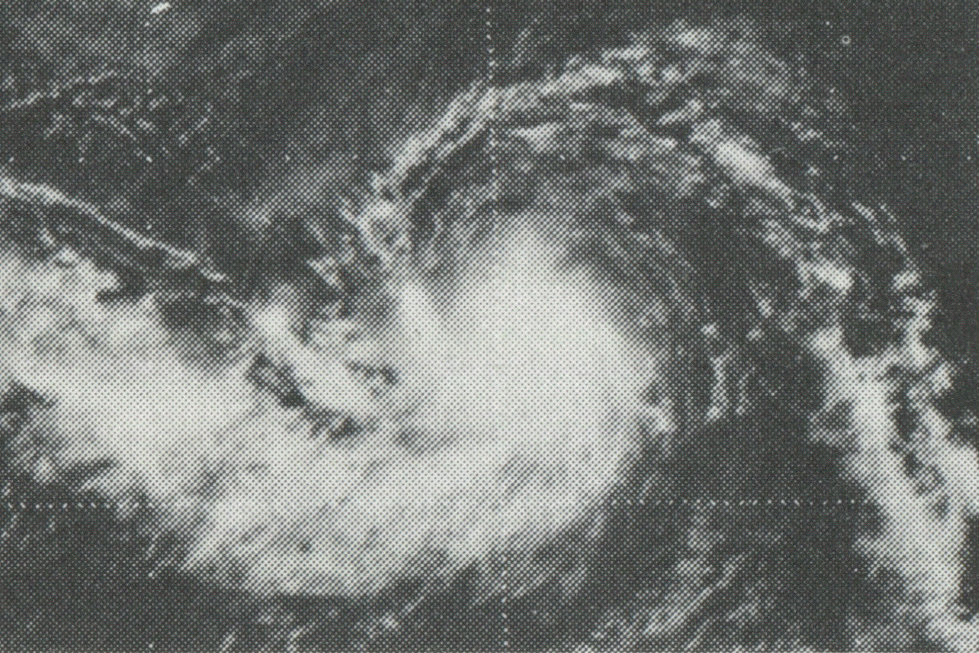
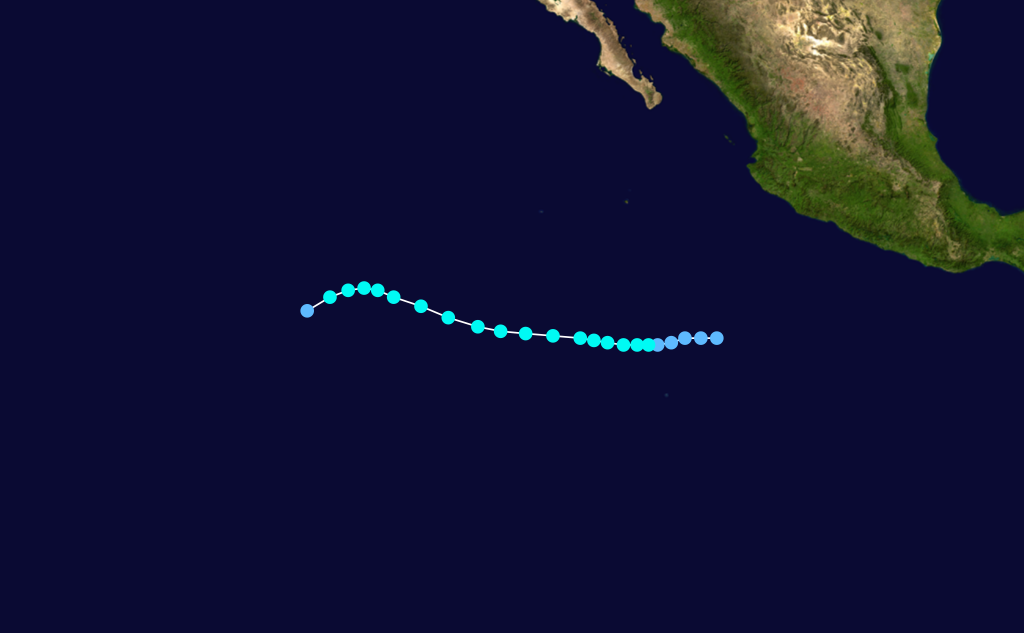
- Duration: September 28 – October 4
- Peak intensity: 50 mph (85 km/h) (1-min);

On September 28, a system developed into a tropical depression, simultaneously with Tropical Storm Monica.. It headed generally westward and on September 29, 18 hours after Monica did it, strengthened into a tropical storm. Nanette continued out to sea and slowly strengthened. It peaked in windspeed of 50 mph (85 km/h) on October 3 and turned to the southwest. It then slowly weakened. On October 4, it weakened into a tropical depression and then degenerated into a disturbance that same day. No damage or deaths were reported.

=== Hurricane Olivia ===
- Category 3 hurricane (SSHWS)
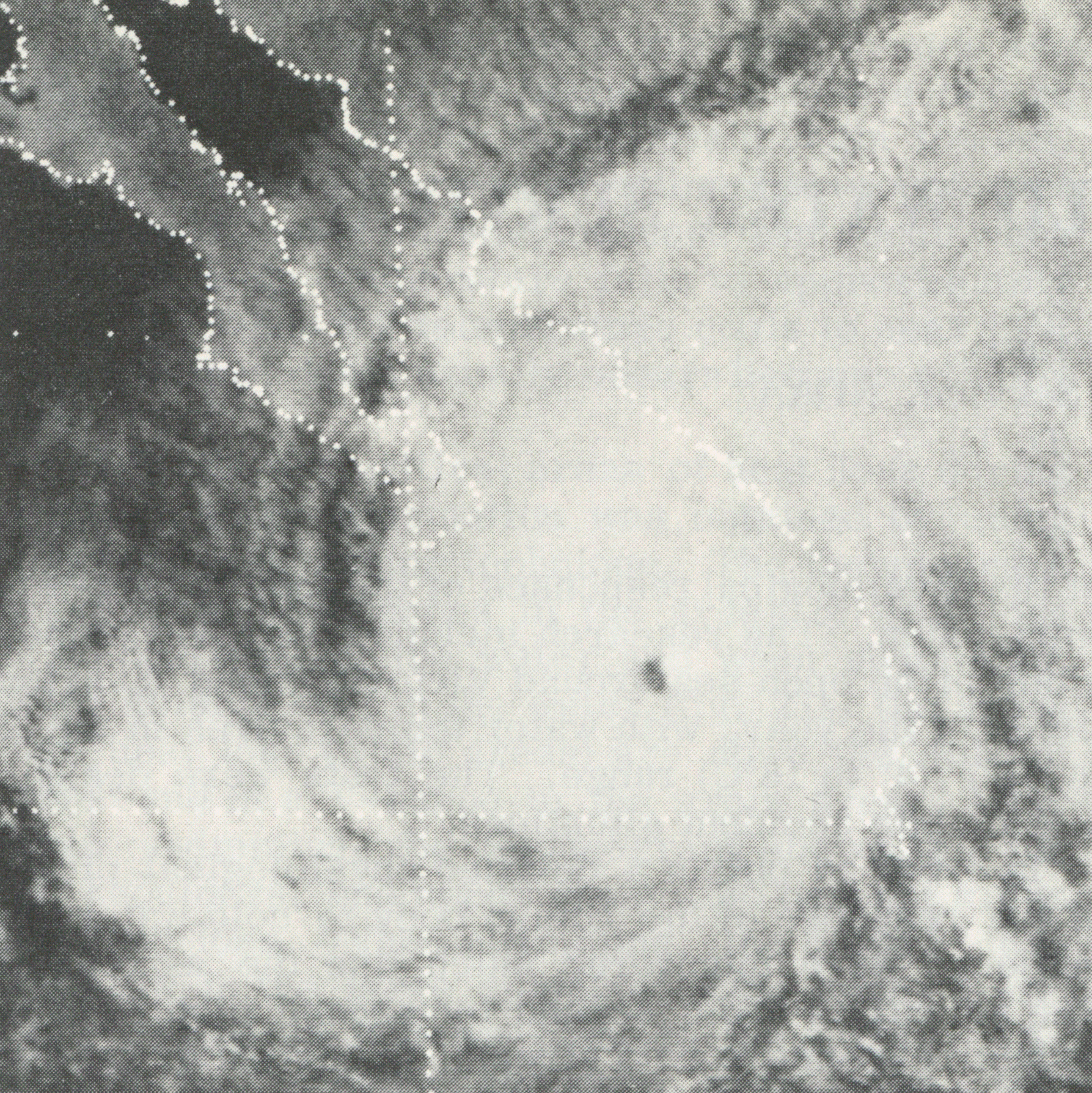
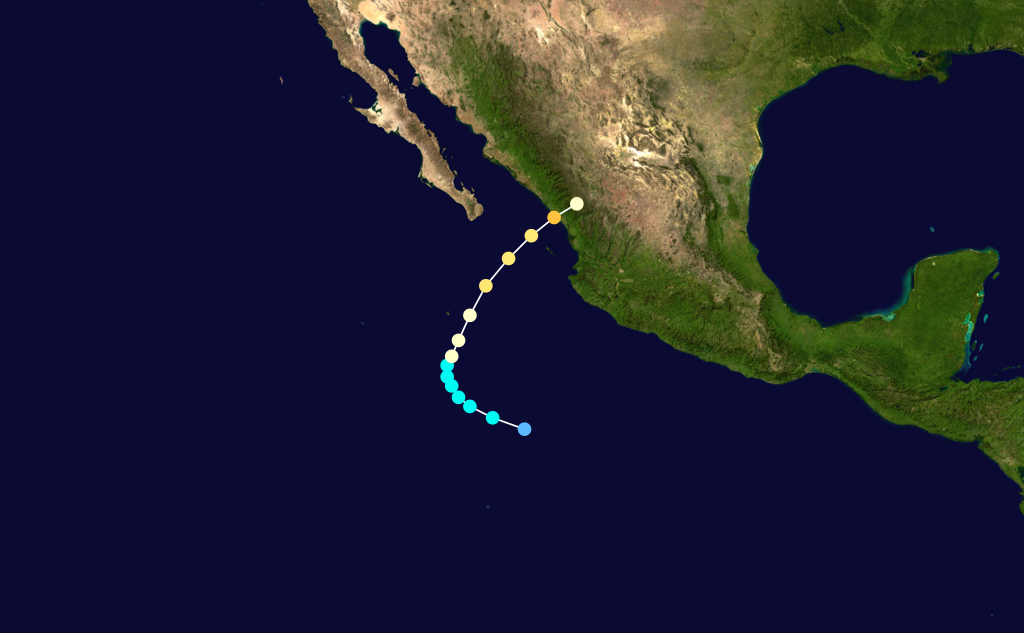
- Duration: October 22 – October 25
- Peak intensity: 115 mph (185 km/h) (1-min);

On October 22, Tropical Depression Eighteen formed from a cluster of three thunderstorms south of Mexico and then strengthened into a tropical storm. It moved northwestward initially, followed by a northeast turn. Olivia then intensified steadily. It reached Category 3 intensity and a peak of 115 mph (185 km/h) winds just before landfall. Early on October 25, Olivia moved ashore just south of Mazatlán causing major damage. Olivia destroyed 7,000 houses in the region, leaving 30,000 people homeless, and damage totaled $20 million (1975 USD, $120 million 2026 USD). The hurricane killed 30 people, 20 of them were from drownings in shrimp boats.

=== Tropical Storm Priscilla ===
- Tropical storm (SSHWS)
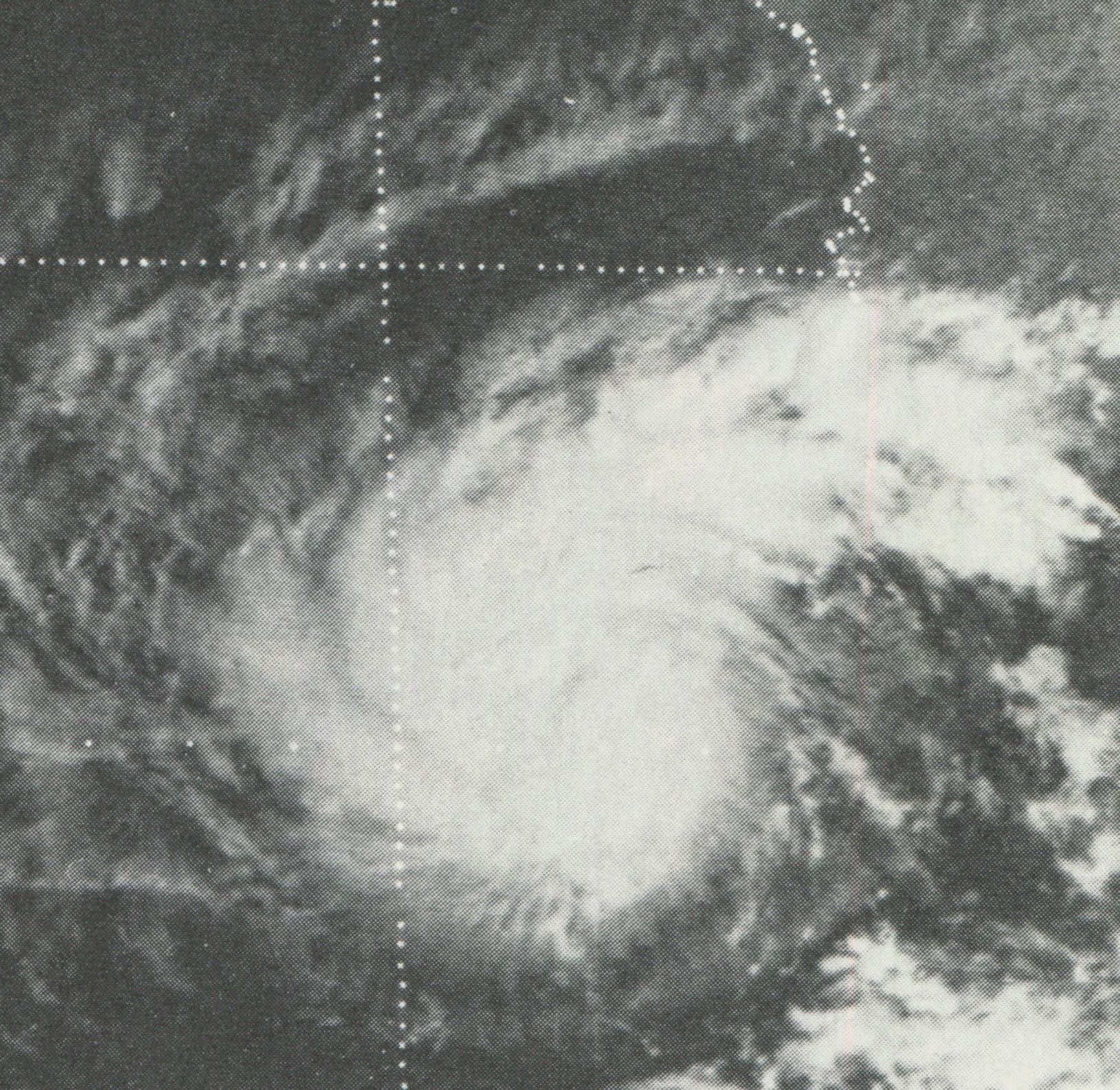
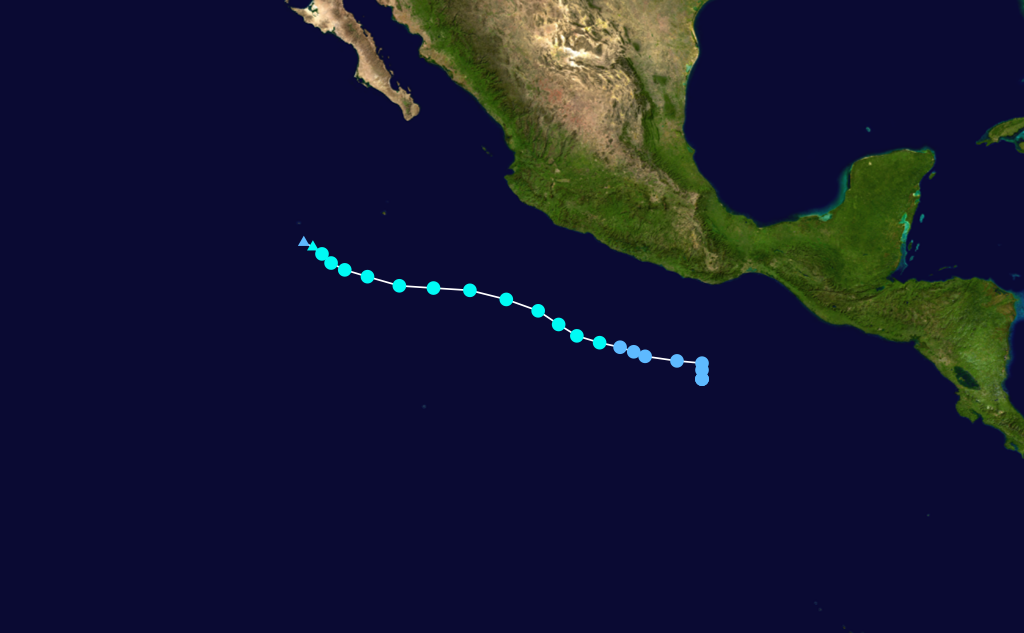
- Duration: November 2 – November 7
- Peak intensity: 65 mph (100 km/h) (1-min);

A nearly stationary cloudy area developed a circulation on November 2. The depression drifted north for a while before turning to the west-northwest on November 3. It intensified into a tropical storm on November 4. Priscilla then began turning to the north. However, the system failed to re-curve, instead, the tropical storm turned generally westward. The tropical storm peaked in windspeed as a 65 mph (100 km/h) high-end storm on November 5. It then turned to the northwest on a heading nearly directly at Clarion Island, but it dissipated on November 7 about 115 mi (185 km) short of landfall.

=== Other systems ===
Besides the tropical storms and hurricanes this season, there were four additional tropical depressions within the eastern Pacific. None of them made landfall anywhere or crossed into the central Pacific. Tropical Cyclone Four formed on July 2 and dissipated the next day. Tropical Cyclone Thirteen formed on September 12 and lasted four days. Tropical Cyclone Seventeen formed October 16 and dissipated a day later. Tropical Cyclone Nineteen formed on November 1 and also dissipated the next day.

== Storm names ==
The following list of names was used for named storms that formed in the North Pacific Ocean east of 140°W in 1975. It was the same list used in the 1971 season. No names were retired following the season; however, an overhaul of the naming system in 1978 to include male names resulted in this list being discarded.

- Agatha
- Bridget
- Carlotta
- Denise
- Eleanor
- Francene
- Georgette
- Hilary
- Ilsa
- Jewel
- Katrina
- Lily
- Monica
- Nanette
- Olivia
- Priscilla
- Ramona (unused)
- Sharon (unused)
- Terry (unused)
- Veronica (unused)
- Winifred (unused)

The season's unnamed hurricane was the only tropical cyclone reported in the North Pacific between 140°W and the International Date Line in 1975. Had the system been named, it would have been assigned one from the west Pacific's typhoon name list by the Joint Typhoon Warning Center on Guam.

== See also ==
- List of Pacific hurricanes
- Pacific hurricane season
- 1975 Atlantic hurricane season
- 1975 Pacific typhoon season
- 1975 North Indian Ocean cyclone season
- Australian cyclone seasons: 1974–75, 1975–76
- South Pacific cyclone seasons: 1974–75, 1975–76
- South-West Indian Ocean cyclone seasons: 1974–75, 1975–76
