= Hurricane Olivia (1975) =

Category 3 Pacific hurricane in 1975

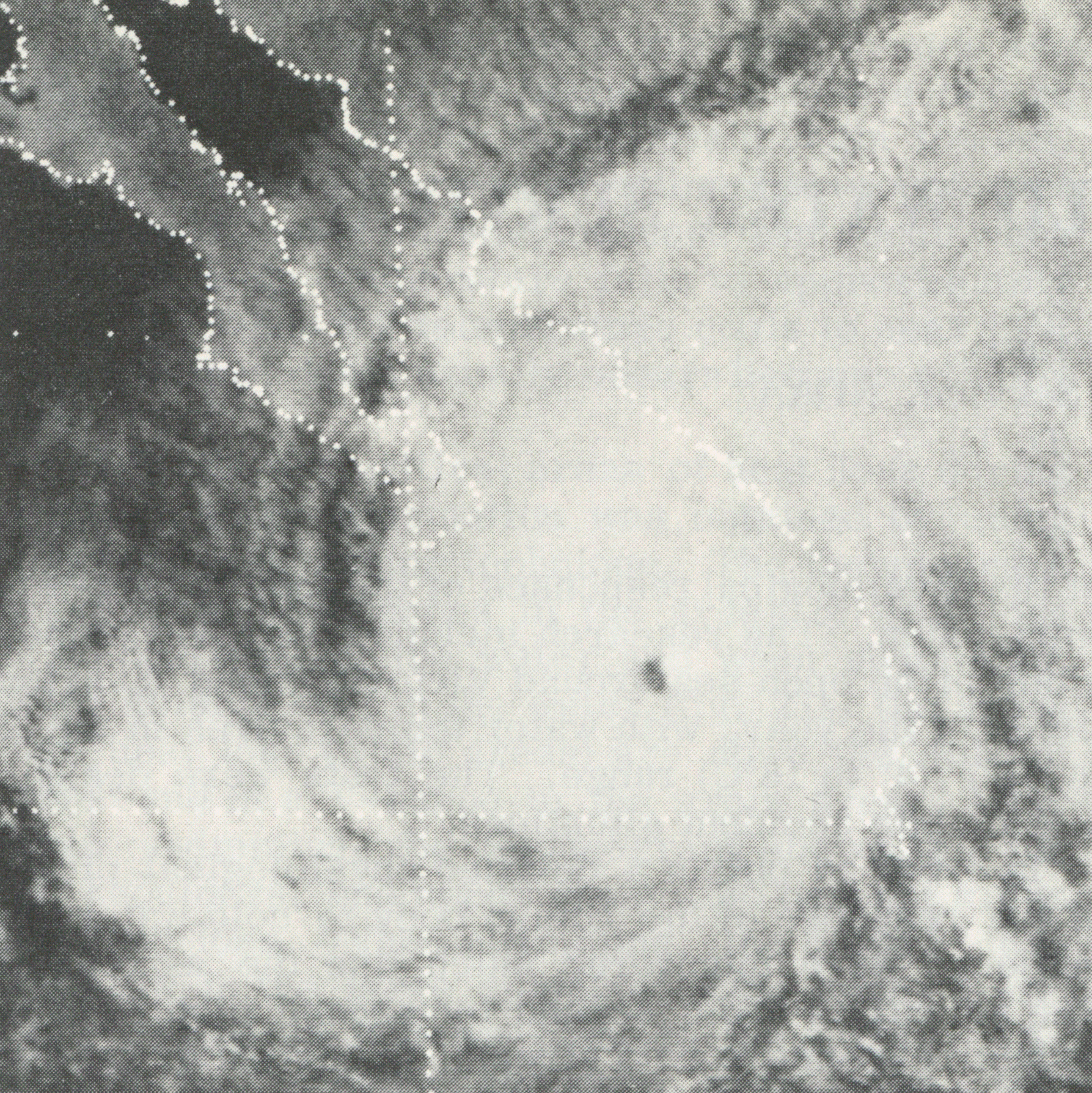
- Hurricane Olivia approaching Sinaloa on October 24

Meteorological history
- Formed: October 22, 1975
- Dissipated: October 25, 1975

Category 3 major hurricane
- 1-minute sustained (SSHWS/NWS)
- Highest winds: 115 mph (185 km/h)

Overall effects
- Fatalities: 30 direct
- Damage: $20 million (1975 USD)
- Areas affected: Mexico
- IBTrACS
- Part of the 1975 Pacific hurricane season

Hurricane Olivia was considered the worst hurricane to hit Mazatlán, Sinaloa since 1943, in addition to being the strongest landfalling and costliest hurricane of the 1975 Pacific hurricane season. Olivia formed on October 22 to the south of Mexico, quickly intensifying into a tropical storm. The storm moved northwestward initially, followed by a northeast turn. On October 23, Olivia attained hurricane status, and the next day reached Category 3 intensity on the Saffir-Simpson scale just before moving ashore Mazatlán in northwest Mexico. Olivia destroyed 7,000 houses in the region, leaving 30,000 people homeless, and damage totaled $20 million (1975 USD, $120 million 2026 USD). The hurricane killed 30 people, 20 of them from drowning in shrimp boats.

== Meteorological history ==
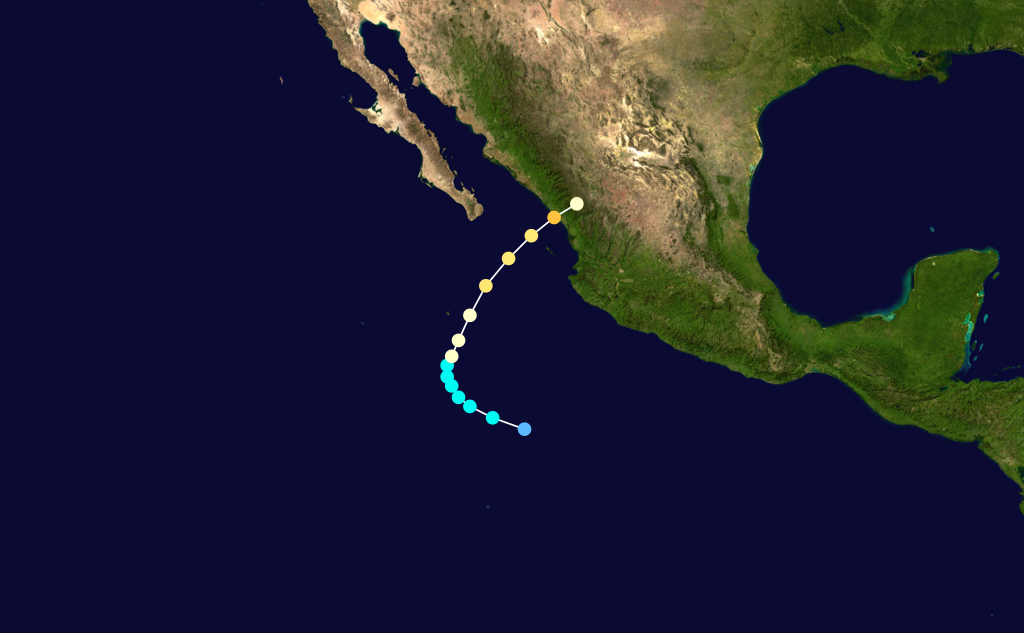
Map plotting the storm's track and intensity, according to the Saffir–Simpson scale Map key Saffir–Simpson scale Tropical depression (≤38 mph, ≤62 km/h) Tropical storm (39–73 mph, 63–118 km/h) Category 1 (74–95 mph, 119–153 km/h) Category 2 (96–110 mph, 154–177 km/h) Category 3 (111–129 mph, 178–208 km/h) Category 4 (130–156 mph, 209–251 km/h) Category 5 (≥157 mph, ≥252 km/h) Unknown Storm type Tropical cyclone Subtropical cyclone Extratropical cyclone, remnant low, tropical disturbance, or monsoon depression

The origins of Olivia were from an extended area of convection, or thunderstorm activity, that persisted southwest of Mexico in late October. Following the development of a circulation, the system formed into a tropical depression early on October 22 about 430 mi (690 km) southwest of Manzanillo, Colima. The depression quickly intensified into Tropical Storm Olivia as it tracked northwestward, although further strengthening was slowed. The circulation became much better defined on October 23 and after Olivia turned northeastward, it attained hurricane status that evening.

After reaching hurricane status, Olivia accelerated to the north-northeast. Several ships crossed its path, encountering strong winds and rough waves. On October 24, a Hurricane Hunters flight observed an elliptical eye and winds of 91 mph (146 km/h). Further intensification occurred, and around 0500 UTC on October 25 Olivia made landfall on Mazatlán, Sinaloa with peak winds of 115 mph (185 km/h) and gusts to 140 mph (230 km/h); this made Olivia a major hurricane, or a Category 3 on the Saffir–Simpson scale. It quickly dissipated after moving ashore.

== Preparations and Impact ==
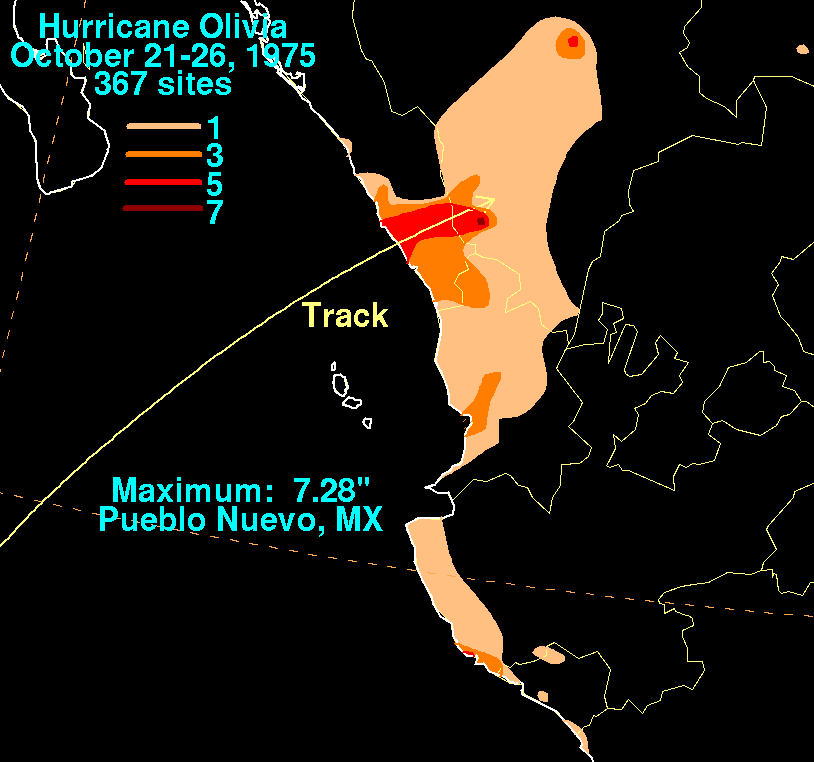
Storm total rainfall for Olivia

Prior to Olivia making landfall, the Mexican military evacuated about 50,000 people from low-lying areas. Accurate forecasts from satellite and ship data were credited with preventing a significant death toll, although the population did not know of the storm's approach until a day before landfall. Officials advised ships to return to port for safety, and the threat of the storm canceled a baseball game. As Olivia moved ashore, it produced locally heavy rainfall, peaking at 7.28 in (185 mm) in Pueblo Nuevo, Durango. The heaviest rains occurred in a narrow region where the hurricane made landfall, although precipitation of around 1 in (25 mm) reached as far south as Michoacán, 340 mi (550 km) south of the landfall location. Winds in Mazatlán reached 138 mph (222 km/h).

The combination of strong winds and heavy rainfall destroyed about 7,000 homes in Mazatlán and 14 nearby villages, with 10,000 houses damaged to some degree. Many of the destroyed homes were poorly built, and the hurricane's passage left 30,000 people homeless; the storm victims were housed in schools, churches, and other buildings not damaged during the storm. Most buildings in the city were affected, with storm debris covering streets. Across the region, the hurricane cut power and water services, and also disrupted the transportation infrastructure by damaging highways and railroads. The airport was also heavily damaged, with flights suspended into the city. Most windows at the airport were blown-out, and 14 small planes were overturned. The strong winds also downed trees, while heavy rainfall resulted in flooding.

Olivia was considered the worst storm in Mazatlán since a hurricane in 1943, and following the storm, the city was declared a disaster zone. Near the coastline and in tourist areas, damage reached $4 million (1975 USD, $23.9 million 2026 USD). Across its path, Olivia killed 30 people and left 500 injured, 17 of them severe. Offshore, 20 of the deaths occurred when three shrimp boats were wrecked. The winds damaged a wall at a prison, killing two prisoners and allowing others to escape. Overall damage totaled $20 million (1975 USD, $120 million 2026 USD).

Olivia is one of only three major hurricanes on record to strike Mazatlán, the others being the 1943 hurricane, as well as another in 1957; in addition Hurricane Tico in 1983 came close to striking the city. Reconstruction began immediately, and the Secretariat of National Defense quickly deployed food and water to the storm victims. By a day after the storm's passage, the Mexican Navy sent two ships worth of relief supplies to Mazatlán, including water, medicine, and rescue equipment. Three days after the storm passed through the region, relief workers began cleaning up the storm debris.

== See also ==
- Other tropical cyclones of the same name
