= List of storms named Narda =

The name Narda has been used for six tropical cyclones in the East Pacific Ocean:

- Tropical Storm Narda (1983) – long-lived tropical storm that affected Hawaii
- Tropical Storm Narda (1989) – weak storm that stayed out to sea
- Hurricane Narda (2001) – Category 1 hurricane that did not affect land
- Tropical Storm Narda (2013) – stayed out to sea
- Tropical Storm Narda (2019) – made landfall in southwestern Mexico
- Hurricane Narda (2025) – long-lived Category 2 hurricane that affected Mexico without making landfall

== See also ==
Storms with similar names

- Cyclone Nada (2016) – a North Indian Ocean cyclonic storm
- Tropical Storm Narra (2026) – a West Pacific Ocean tropical storm
