= List of storms named Marty =

The name Marty has been used for eight tropical cyclones, seven in the Eastern Pacific Ocean and one in the Western Pacific Ocean.

In the Eastern Pacific:

- Hurricane Marty (1985) – Category 1 hurricane that did not affect land
- Hurricane Marty (1991) – Category 1 hurricane that briefly threatened the Mexican coastline
- Tropical Storm Marty (1997) – weak storm that never threatened land
- Hurricane Marty (2003) – Category 2 hurricane that made two landfalls on the Baja California peninsula
- Tropical Storm Marty (2009) – weak storm that never affected land
- Hurricane Marty (2015) – Category 1 hurricane affected southwestern Mexico
- Tropical Storm Marty (2021) – weak storm that had no effect on land; formed from the remnants of Atlantic basin Hurricane Grace

In the Western Pacific:

- Tropical Storm Marty (1996) – a minimal storm that killed 125 in Vietnam

== See also ==
- List of storms named Martin
