= List of storms named Enrique =

The name Enrique has been used for eight tropical cyclones in the Eastern Pacific Ocean.

- Hurricane Enrique (1979) – strong Category 4 hurricane that remained at sea.
- Tropical Storm Enrique (1985) – weak tropical storm that brought showers to Hawaii.
- Hurricane Enrique (1991) – long-lived hurricane that was one of seven tropical cyclones to exist in all three tropical cyclone basins in the Pacific Ocean.
- Hurricane Enrique (1997) – remained at sea and never threatened land.
- Tropical Storm Enrique (2003) – strong tropical storm that had no effects on land.
- Tropical Storm Enrique (2009) – another strong tropical storm that did not affect land.
- Tropical Storm Enrique (2015) – lasted for a week without affecting land.
- Hurricane Enrique (2021) – strong Category 1 hurricane that paralleled the coast of Mexico.
