= Tropical Storm Narda (2019) =

Pacific tropical storm in 2019

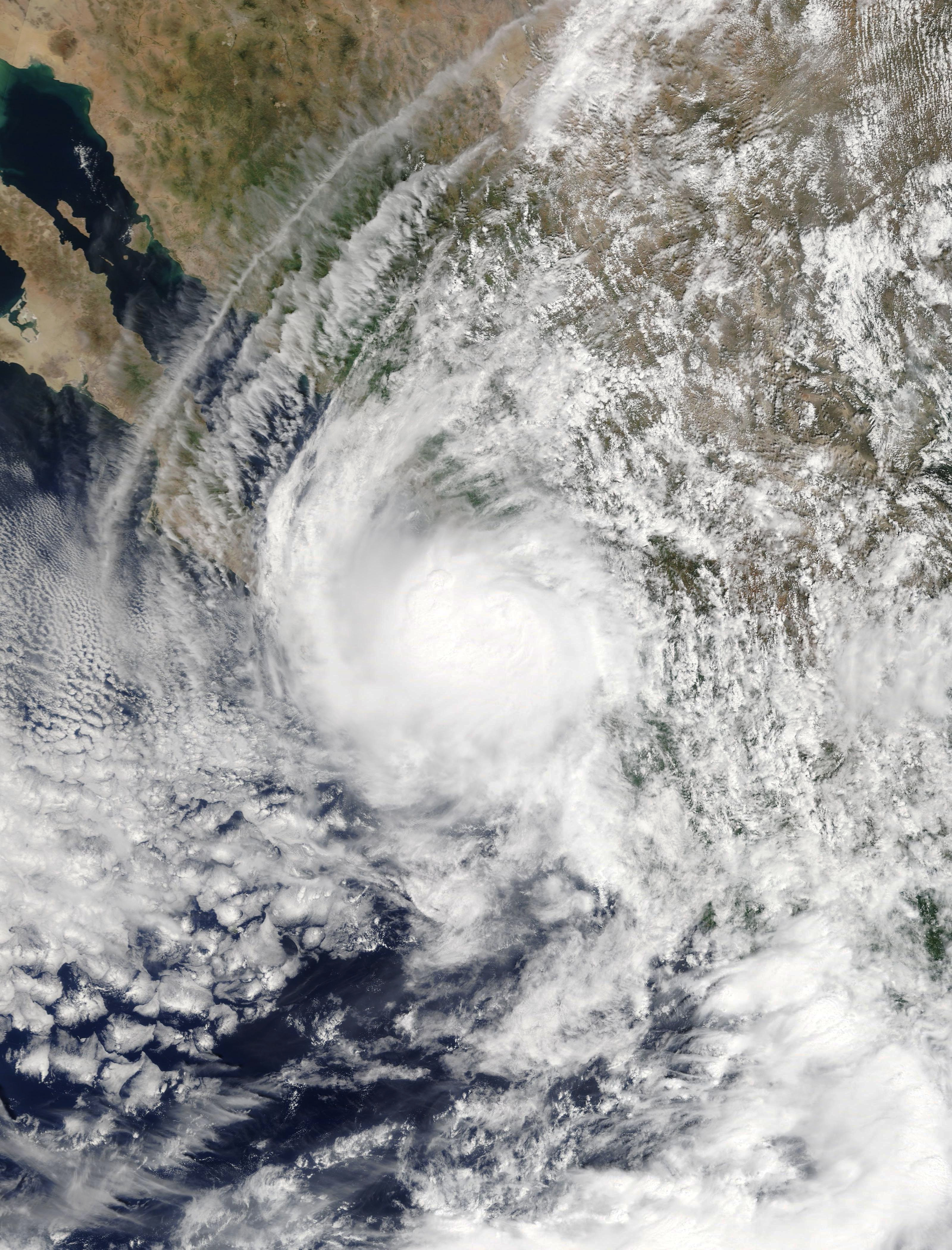
- Narda at peak intensity off the coast of Sinaloa on September 30

Meteorological history
- Formed: September 29, 2019
- Dissipated: October 1, 2019

Tropical storm
- 1-minute sustained (SSHWS/NWS)
- Highest winds: 50 mph (85 km/h)
- Lowest pressure: 998 mbar (hPa); 29.47 inHg

Overall effects
- Fatalities: 6 total
- Damage: $162 million (2019 USD)
- Areas affected: Western Mexico, Baja California peninsula, Southwestern United States
- IBTrACS /
- Part of the 2019 Pacific hurricane season

Tropical Storm Narda was a short-lived tropical storm that remained close to the Pacific coast of Mexico, causing flash flooding and mudslides in southwestern Mexico and the Baja California Peninsula in late September 2019. The fourteenth named storm of the 2019 Pacific hurricane season, Narda developed from a broad area of low pressure that formed off the Central American Pacific coast on September 26. The broad low gradually organized as it moved west-northwestward, and it became Tropical Storm Narda early on September 29 while located off the southern coast of Mexico. The cyclone strengthened slightly before it moved inland near Manzanillo. Narda weakened to a tropical depression after moving inland, but restrengthened into a tropical storm on September 30 as it emerged over the Pacific Ocean just south of the Gulf of California. Narda quickly strengthened, and reached its peak intensity with winds of 50 mph (85 km/h) that day before making a second landfall along the northwestern coast of Mexico. The tropical cyclone weakened rapidly as it moved along the coastline, and it weakened to a tropical depression before dissipating just off the coast of Sonora on October 1.

== Meteorological history ==
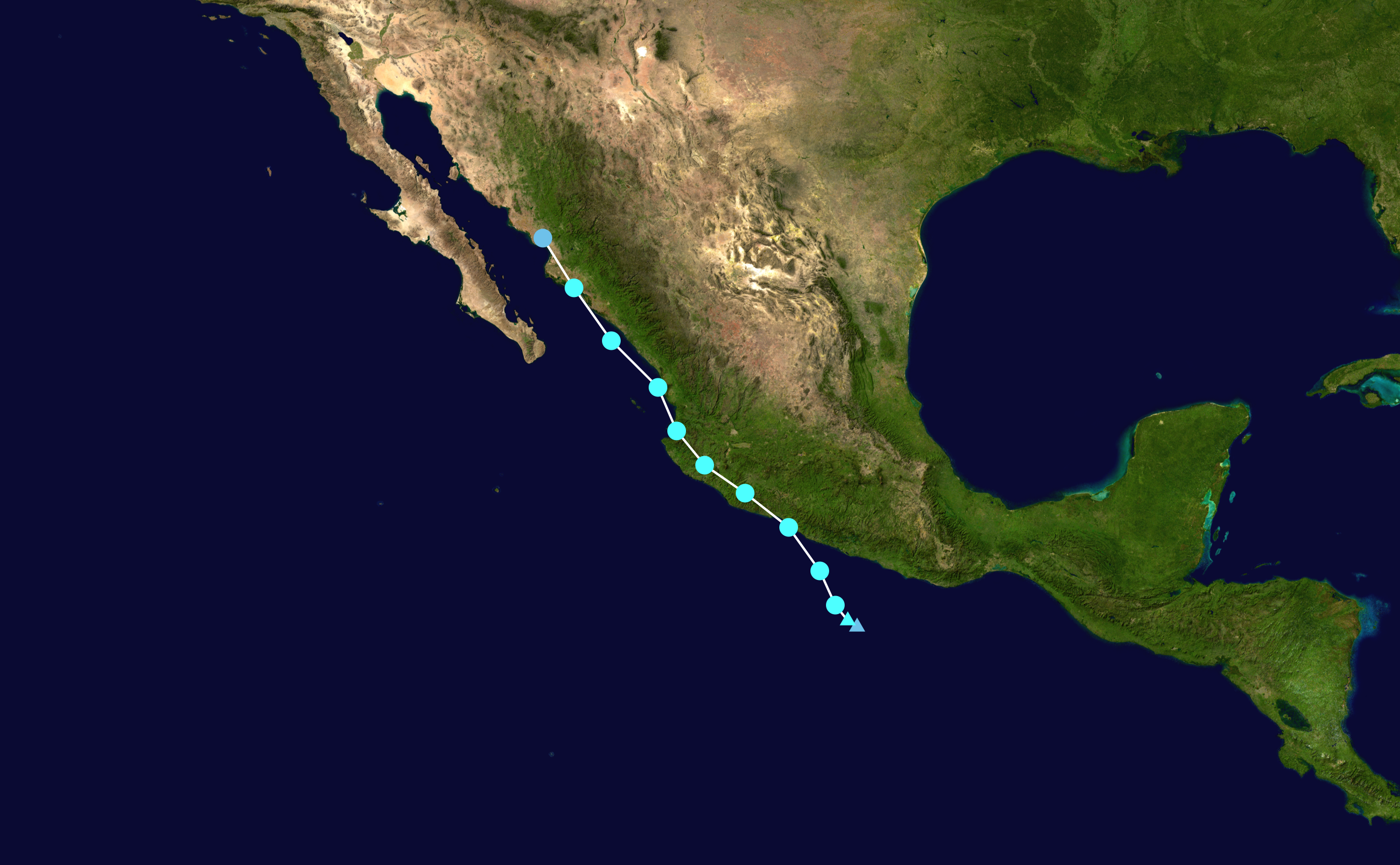
Map plotting the storm's track and intensity, according to the Saffir–Simpson scale Map key Saffir–Simpson scale Tropical depression (≤38 mph, ≤62 km/h) Tropical storm (39–73 mph, 63–118 km/h) Category 1 (74–95 mph, 119–153 km/h) Category 2 (96–110 mph, 154–177 km/h) Category 3 (111–129 mph, 178–208 km/h) Category 4 (130–156 mph, 209–251 km/h) Category 5 (≥157 mph, ≥252 km/h) Unknown Storm type Tropical cyclone Subtropical cyclone Extratropical cyclone, remnant low, tropical disturbance, or monsoon depression

On September 23, the United States National Hurricane Center (NHC) noted the potential for an area of low pressure to form south of the southern coast of Mexico over that coming weekend. A broad and elongated trough of low pressure developed near the coast of Central America on September 26, and a broad area of low pressure developed along this trough two days later south-southeast of Acapulco. The disturbance continued to gradually become better organized through the following day, and although it still lacked a well-defined center of circulation, the threat of tropical storm-force winds along the southwestern coast of Mexico prompted the initiation of advisories on Potential Tropical Cyclone Sixteen-E at 15:00 UTC on September 28. Early on the following day, the disturbance's circulation became better defined, and an increase in convective banding occurred over the western portion of the broad system. As a result, the NHC classified the system as Tropical Storm Narda at 03:00 UTC on September 29.

Moving slowly northward toward the southern coast of Mexico, Narda gradually became better organized and strengthened to an initial peak intensity with winds of 45 mph (75 km/h) as banding features became evident. However, later that day, satellite imagery and radar data from coastal stations in Mexico indicated that the center of Narda relocated further north and close to the coast of Mexico near Zihuatanejo. As it moved inland, Narda quickly became less organized, and the cyclone weakened to a tropical depression at 21:00 UTC as the center moved over the mountains of southwestern Mexico.

Narda emerged over the eastern Pacific Ocean early on September 30 near the Islas Marías as a poorly-organized tropical depression. However, the cyclone continued to produce a large area of deep convection near and west of its center, and it soon restrengthened into a tropical storm at 15:00 UTC that day. Throughout the day, Narda continued to become better organized as it moved over the warm waters of the Gulf of California. Microwave imagery revealed the presence of well-defined banding features and a mid-level eye feature located just off the Mexican coast, and Narda reached its peak intensity with maximum sustained winds of 50 mph (85 km/h) at 21:00 UTC on September 30. Six hours later, Narda made its second landfall along the northwestern coast of Mexico near Topolobampo as a slightly weaker cyclone with winds of 45 mph (75 km/h). Narda continued to weaken as it hugged the northwestern coast of Mexico, and by 12:00 UTC on October 1 it had weakened to a tropical depression while just off the coast. The cyclone continued to rapidly weaken, and three hours later, Narda dissipated near the northwestern coast of Mexico.

== Preparations and impact ==
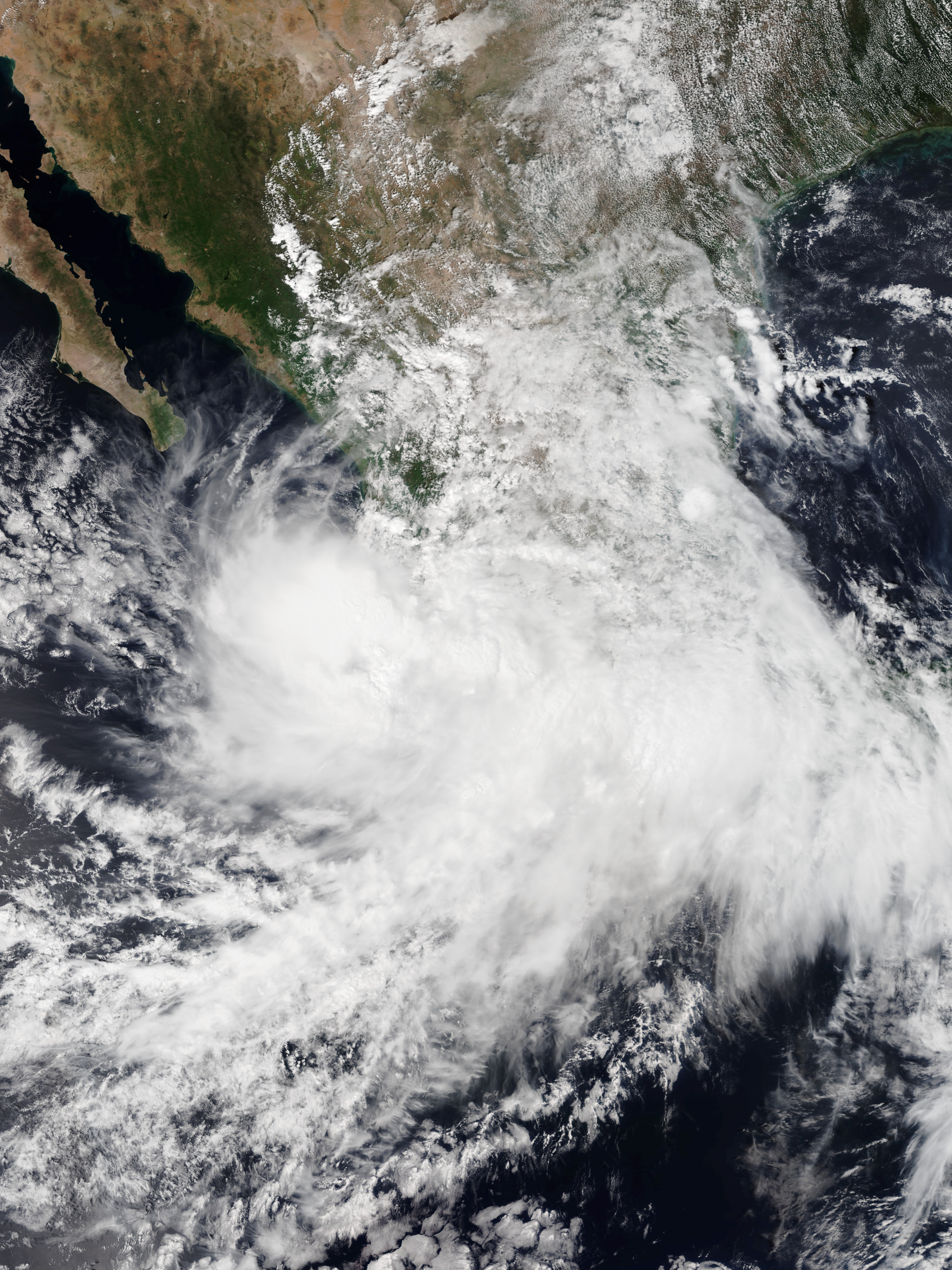
Tropical Storm Narda near the southern coast of Mexico on September 29

Upon the initiation of advisories on Potential Tropical Cyclone Sixteen-E on September 28, the Government of Mexico issued a tropical storm warning along the southwestern coast of Mexico from Acapulco to Cabo Corrientes. These warnings were discontinued at 21:00 UTC on September 29 after Narda had moved inland and weakened. However, six hours later, tropical storm warnings were again issued, this time for the northwestern coast of Mexico from San Blas to Topolobampo, while a tropical storm watch was also issued northward to Guaymas. The watch was upgraded to a warning at 15:00 UTC on September 30 as Narda approached the coast. All warnings were discontinued on October 1 after Narda had once again weakened to a tropical depression.

Remaining near the coast of western Mexico for three days, Narda produced heavy rainfall that triggered flash flooding and mudslides across much of western Mexico. In Oaxaca, two deaths occurred as a result of the storm: a 26-year-old man died after he was dragged by strong river currents in San Pedro Mixtepec, Miahuatlán, and a 17-year-old boy drowned after he was dragged by strong currents along the San Cristóbal River in the community of San Jerónimo Coatlán, Sierra Sur de Oaxaca. In the Tecomán Municipality, Colima, a 29-year-old man died after he was dragged away by strong currents while fishing on his boat in the Alcuzahue Lagoon. In the municipality of Malinaltepec, Guerrero, a 28-year-old man lost his life after he was trapped under a mudslide while traveling on the Tlapa–Marquelia highway. More than 70 homes in the municipality were damaged and 55 families were displaced. The storm also damaged 23 roads, forcing their closure, and caused 17 communities to lose power. In Jalisco, 834 homes in the municipalities of Villa Purificación, Tomatlán, and Cabo Corrientes were damaged, and schools across the 30 municipalities of Jalisco were closed on September 30. The Aquiles Serdán bridge connecting Cabo Corrientes with several communities collapsed due to flooding, and there were two reported fatalities as a result of the storm in Jalisco. Total damage across the country reached 3.21 billion pesos (US$162 million).

== See also ==
- Weather of 2019
- Tropical cyclones in 2019
- Timeline of the 2019 Pacific hurricane season
- Other storms of the same name
- Tropical Storm Norman (2000) – similar storm of the same intensity
- Hurricane Manuel (2013) – caused disastrous flooding in western Mexico
- Hurricane Lorena (2019) – affected the same areas one week prior
- Tropical Storm Dolores (2021) – similar storm of the same intensity
