= List of storms named Lorena =

The name Lorena has been used for six tropical cyclones in the Eastern Pacific Ocean.

- Hurricane Lorena (1983) – a Category 3 hurricane that brushed the Mexican coastline
- Hurricane Lorena (1989) – a Category 1 hurricane that brushed the Mexican coastline
- Tropical Storm Lorena (2001) – approached Mexico but dissipated before making landfall
- Tropical Storm Lorena (2013) – weak storm that brushed the Mexican coastline
- Hurricane Lorena (2019) – a Category 1 hurricane that made landfall in Baja California
- Hurricane Lorena (2025) – a Category 1 hurricane that paralleled the Baja California peninsula
