= Hurricane Marty (2015) =

Pacific tropical cyclone in 2015

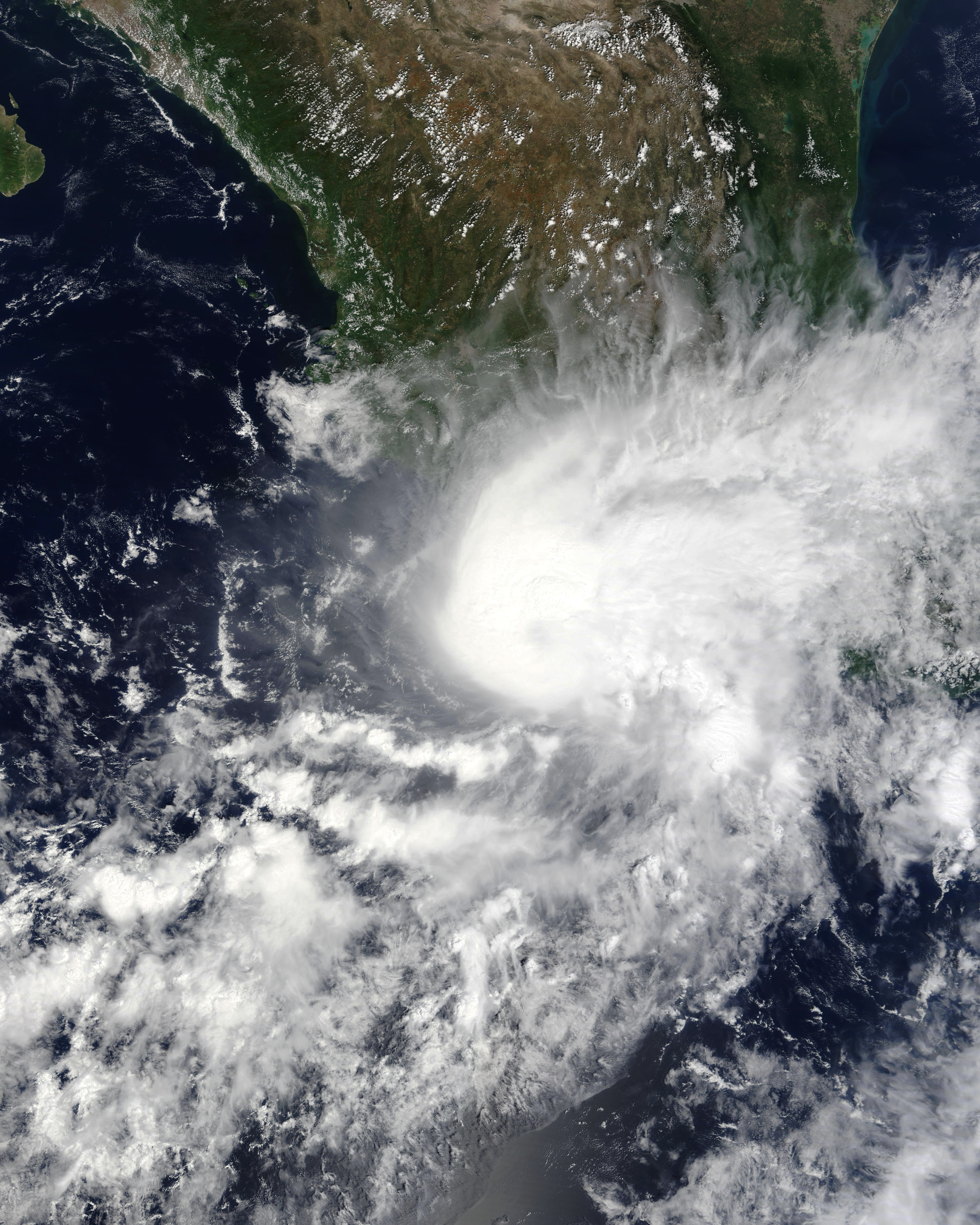
- Hurricane Marty at peak intensity off Mexico on September 28

Meteorological history
- Formed: September 26, 2015
- Remnant low: September 30, 2015
- Dissipated: October 4, 2015

Category 1 hurricane
- 1-minute sustained (SSHWS/NWS)
- Highest winds: 80 mph (130 km/h)
- Lowest pressure: 987 mbar (hPa); 29.15 inHg

Overall effects
- Fatalities: None
- Damage: $30 million (2015 USD)
- Areas affected: Southwestern and Western Mexico
- IBTrACS /
- Part of the 2015 Pacific hurricane season

Hurricane Marty was a tropical cyclone that produced heavy rains and flooding in several states in Southwestern and Western Mexico. The twentieth named storm and twelfth hurricane of the annual hurricane season, Marty developed from a tropical wave on September 26, 2015, to the southwest of Acapulco, Guerrero, in Mexico. Initially a tropical depression, the system strengthened into a tropical storm early on the following day. Due to favorable atmospheric conditions, Marty continued to intensify, but wind shear sharply increased as the storm approached a large mid- to upper-level trough. Despite this, the cyclone deepened further, becoming a hurricane on September 28 and peaking with sustained winds of 80 mph (130 km/h) shortly thereafter. Wind shear quickly took its toll on the hurricane, weakening it to a tropical storm early on September 29. About 24 hours later, Marty degenerated into a post-tropical low-pressure area offshore Guerrero. The low further degenerated into a trough later on September 30, and eventually dissipated on October 4.

In anticipation of the storm, tropical cyclone warnings and watches were issued in the states of Guerrero and Michoacán. Flooding occurred, particularly in Guerrero, where areas near Acapulco observed 5 to 6 in (130 to 150 mm) of rainfall. There were several landslides and over 300 homes in the municipality of Coyuca de Benitez were flooded. The remnants also caused severe flooding in Sonora. About 800 homes and 400 vehicles were damaged in the city of Guaymas alone. Total damage in the state reached MXN$500 million (US$30 million).

== Meteorological history ==
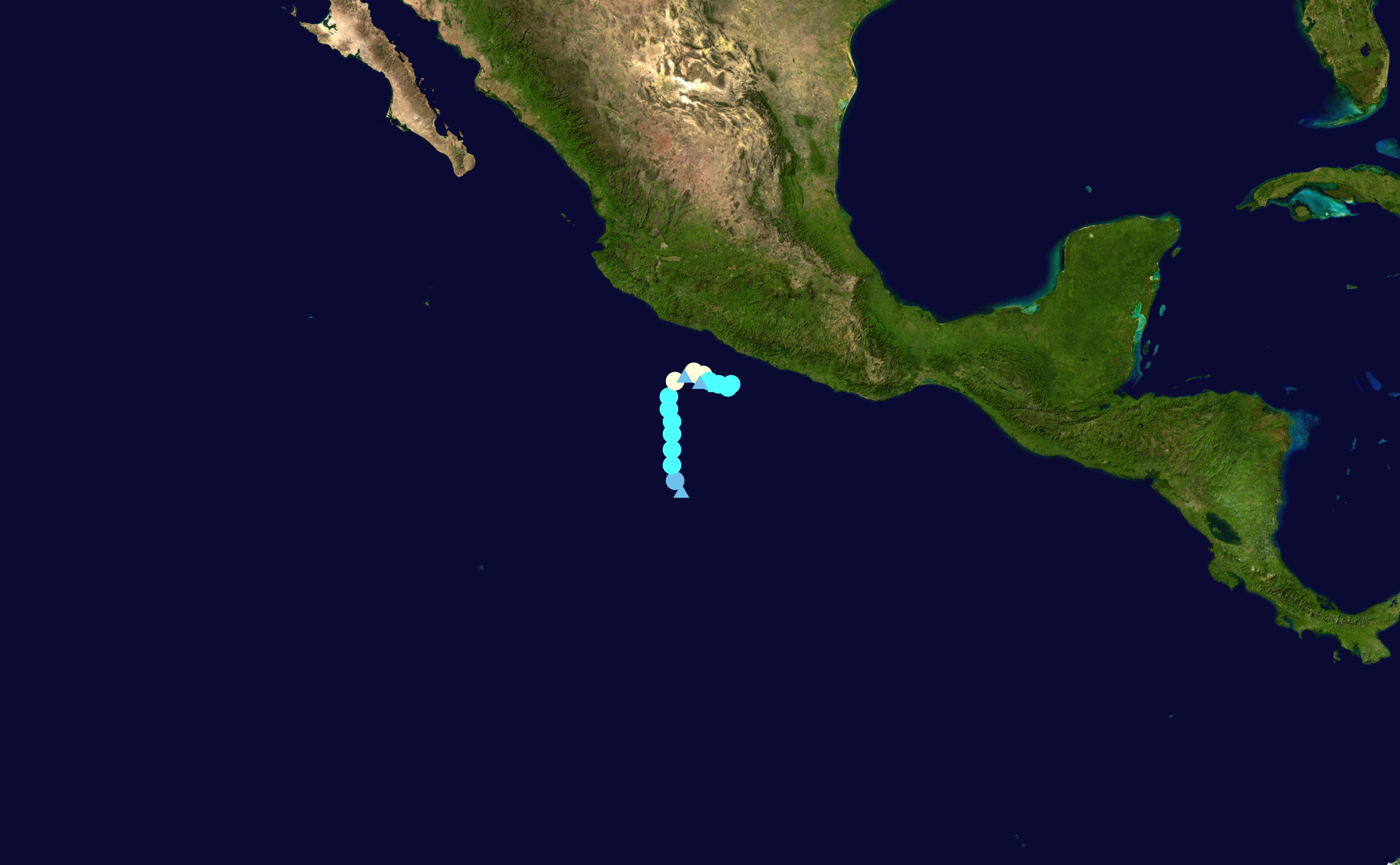
Map plotting the track and intensity of the storm according to the Saffir–Simpson hurricane wind scale Map key Saffir–Simpson scale Tropical depression (≤38 mph, ≤62 km/h) Tropical storm (39–73 mph, 63–118 km/h) Category 1 (74–95 mph, 119–153 km/h) Category 2 (96–110 mph, 154–177 km/h) Category 3 (111–129 mph, 178–208 km/h) Category 4 (130–156 mph, 209–251 km/h) Category 5 (≥157 mph, ≥252 km/h) Unknown Storm type Tropical cyclone Subtropical cyclone Extratropical cyclone, remnant low, tropical disturbance, or monsoon depression

A tropical wave emerged into the Atlantic Ocean from the west coast of Africa on September 10. Tracking westward, the wave split into two portions, with the slower-moving northern portion ultimately developing into Atlantic Tropical Depression Nine on September 16. The southern portion crossed Venezuela and Colombia and emerged into the Pacific, where a large area of deep convection began to form. A well-defined low-pressure area developed on September 26, and organized into a tropical depression by 18:00 UTC (1 p.m. CDT) the same day while situated about 335 mi (539 km) southwest of Acapulco, Guerrero. Six hours later, after banding features became more defined and intensity estimates using the Dvorak technique showed a slight increase in intensity, the depression was classified as a tropical storm and was accordingly named Marty by the National Hurricane Center (NHC). At the time, the storm was moving slowly northward due to the influence of a large mid- to upper-level trough.

Located in a favorable environment of sea surface temperatures around 86 °F (30 °C) and low vertical wind shear, Marty strengthened steadily. Early on September 27, the NHC noted that rapid intensification was possible. However, as Marty neared the base of the trough, westerly vertical wind shear increased rapidly, causing the low-level circulation center to be partially exposed. Despite the hostile wind shear, the cyclone reformed a central dense overcast and intensified into a hurricane by 12:00 UTC (7 a.m. CDT) on September 28, as a mid-level eye feature was seen in microwave satellite imagery. Operationally, the NHC upgraded Marty to a hurricane nine hours later, after a reconnaissance aircraft flight observed hurricane-force winds. At 18:00 UTC, Marty attained its peak intensity, with maximum sustained winds of 80 mph (130 km/h) and a minimum barometric pressure of 987 mbar (987 hPa; 29.1 inHg). Computer forecast models indicated that the storm would pass within just 25 mi (40 km) of the Southwestern Mexican coast on September 29 or September 30.

Turning north and northeast while under the influence of the aforementioned trough, Marty began to weaken soon after peak intensity as deep convection was displaced to the east due to the strong westerly shear; the low-level circulation center became fully exposed in a span of three hours late on September 28. Upwelling of cooler waters further decayed the deep convection, prompting the NHC to downgrade Marty to a tropical storm at 06:00 UTC (1 a.m. CDT) on September 29. Continuing to steadily weaken, Marty degenerated into a post-tropical low a day later about 140 mi (230 km) west-southwest of Acapulco, while still producing gale-force winds. The shallow system turned westward in the low-level flow and eventually opened up into a trough twelve hours later about 195 mi (314 km) west of Acapulco. The low became closed once again on October 1; however, it failed to produce sufficient organized deep convection to re-qualify as a tropical cyclone. It turned north-northeastwards towards the southern Gulf of California; however, it dissipated before reaching the coast of Western Mexico. The remnant moisture continued into Northwestern Mexico and caused flooding in Sonora.

== Preparations and impact ==
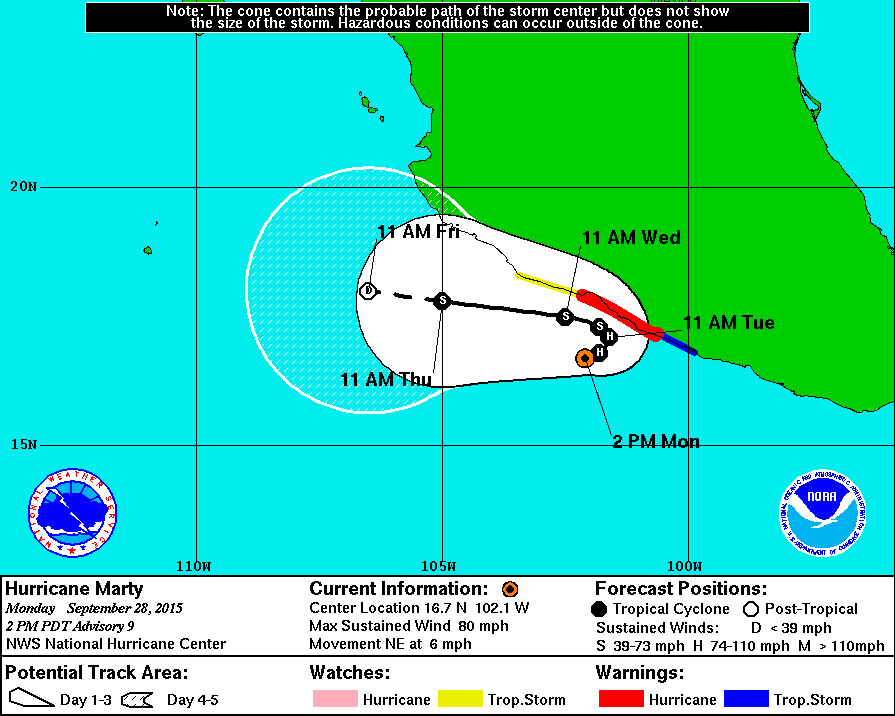
The NHC's five-day forecast track for Hurricane Marty at 2:00 p.m. PDT (21:00 UTC) on September 28, 2015, depicting the storm stalling just off Southwestern Mexico as a hurricane.

In preparation for the arrival of Marty, classes were suspended in Acapulco and the Costa Grande region. The Mexican Navy was put on standby to deal with incidents occurring within the zones of Chiapas, Guerrero, Michoacan and Jalisco. The Government of Mexico issued multiple watches and warnings for coastal communities across Guerrero; by 21:00 UTC (4 p.m. CDT) on September 28, a tropical storm watch was in effect for west of Lázaro Cárdenas to Punta San Telmo, a tropical storm warning for Acapulco to east of Tecpán de Galeana, and a hurricane warning for Tecpán de Galeana to Lázaro Cárdenas. These were discontinued as Marty weakened and moved away from the region; all had been cancelled by early on September 30.

Stalling south of Mexico, Marty produced heavy rains, mainly in the state of Guerrero. Many areas reported at least 2 in (51 mm) of rain between September 26 and October 1; coastal areas near and west of Acapulco received up to 6 in (150 mm). As river levels rose, a state of emergency was declared for eight municipalities, which was only concluded on September 30. Two landslides occurred in Chilpancingo; several others occurred in Coyuca de Benitez and Sierra de Atoyac. More than 300 homes were flooded with up to 6 in (15 cm) of water in Coyuca de Benitez. Three temporary shelters were opened in Barra de Coyuca; however, they were closed as no one moved in.

As the remnants of Marty moved into northwestern Mexico, heavy rains and flooding rendered 35,000 people homeless in Sonora. A state of emergency was declared in 16 municipalities. Flooding in Guaymas, which was hit hardest, damaged 800 homes and 400 vehicles; three people sustained injuries when a wall collapsed. The Mexico-Nogales Highway between Guaymas and Ciudad Obregón had to be closed due to the floods. Total estimated damage in the state amounted to MXN$500 million (US$30 million).

== See also ==
- Weather of 2015
- Tropical cyclones in 2015
- List of Category 1 Pacific hurricanes
- Other storms of the same name
- Hurricane Manuel (2013)
- Hurricane Carlos (2015)
- Hurricane Agatha (2022)
