= List of Category 1 Pacific hurricanes =

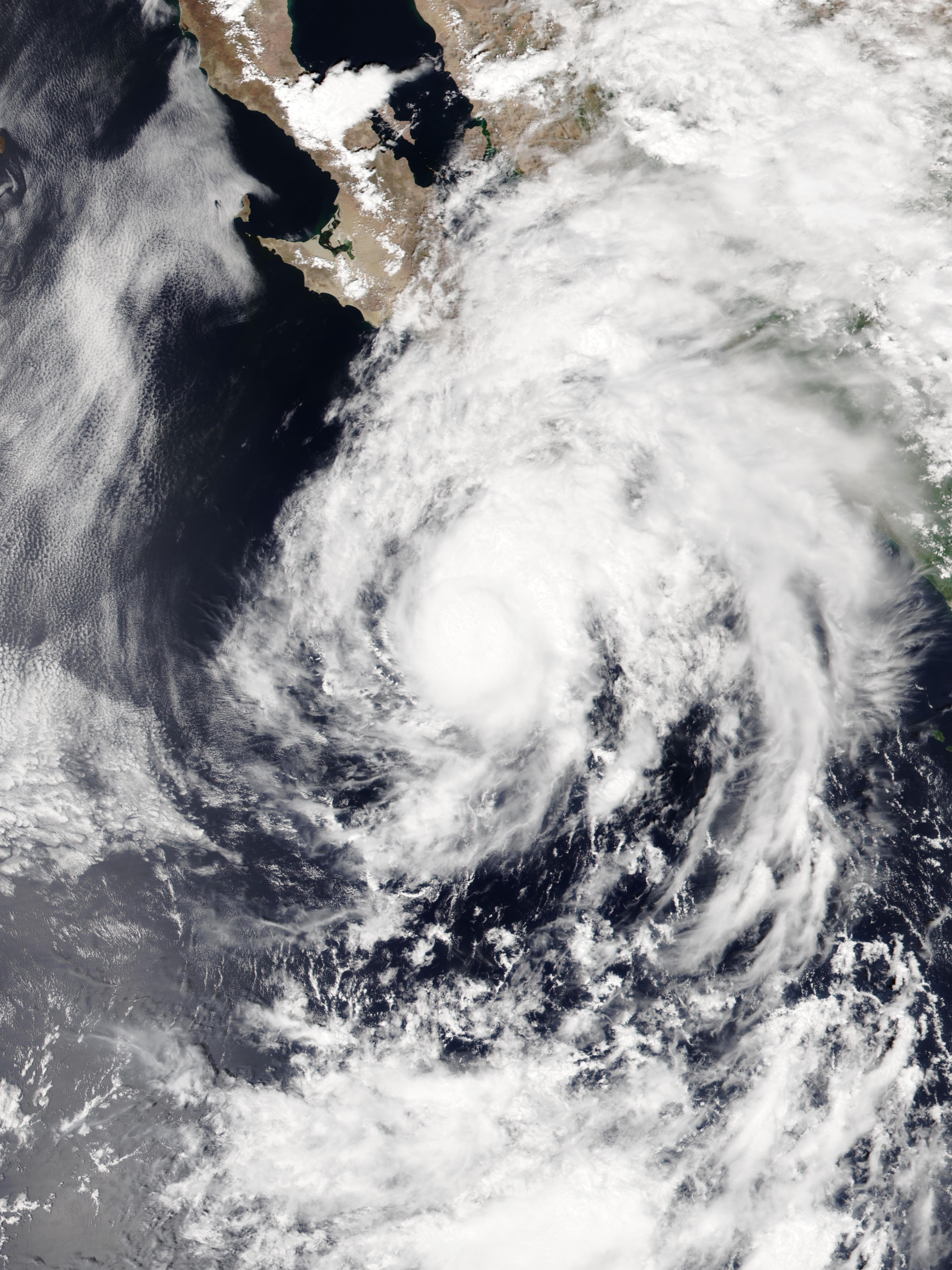
Hurricane Lorena at peak intensity on September 3, 2025.

Category 1 is the lowest classification on the Saffir–Simpson hurricane wind scale, and categorizes tropical cyclones with 1-minute maximum sustained winds between 64 and 82 knots (74 and 94 mph; 119 and 152 km/h; 33 and 42 m/s). Tropical cyclones that attain such winds and move over land while maintaining those winds are capable of causing minor to moderate damage to human lives and infrastructure. As of 2021, a total of 242 hurricanes have peaked at Category 1 strength within the Northeast Pacific tropical cyclone basin, which is denoted as the part of the Pacific Ocean north of the equator and east of the International Date Line. Collectively, Category 1 hurricanes have killed at least 912 people. This does not include storms that also attained Category 2, 3, 4, or 5 status on the scale.

A combination of many factors serve to influence the development of tropical cyclones in the Northeastern Pacific basin. During the winter and early spring months from December to April, a high-pressure area known as the North Pacific High and a low-pressure area known as the Aleutian Low are present over the Northeastern Pacific, producing strong upper-level winds which inhibit tropical cyclone formation. During the late spring, summer, and fall months from May to November, these effects are reduced or may even vanish altogether, while sea surface temperatures are warm enough to support the development, perhaps even rapid, of tropical cyclones. The El Niño–Southern Oscillation plays a major role in the strength of trade winds and the sea surface temperatures in the tropical Pacific. During El Niño events, trade winds are weaker and sea surface temperatures are warmer, allowing for the development of more cyclones as well as more intense hurricanes, while the effects of La Niña are the opposite.

== Background ==
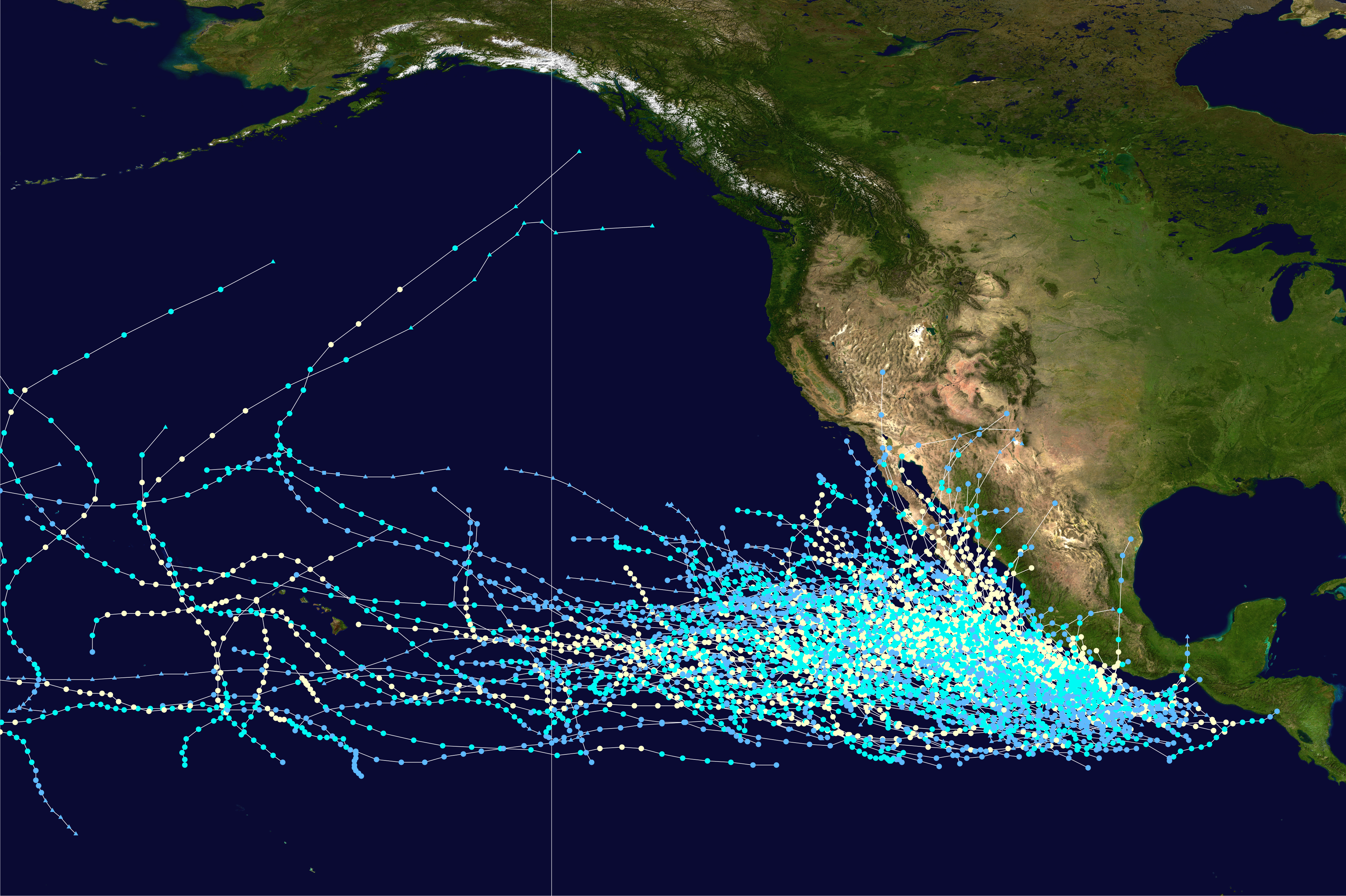
Tracks of all known Category 1 Pacific hurricanes from 1949 to 2018 in the central and eastern Pacific basins

On the Saffir–Simpson scale, a hurricane reaches Category 1 status when it attains maximum sustained winds of between 64 and 82 knots (74 and 94 mph; 119 and 152 km/h; 33 and 42 m/s). The National Hurricane Center (NHC) takes sustained winds to be the average wind speed measured over the period of one minute at the height of 10 metres (33 ft) above the ground. Should a Category 1 hurricane make landfall, its strongest winds can cause moderate damage to human infrastructure, especially to older buildings.

The Northeast Pacific tropical cyclone basin is defined as the region of the Pacific Ocean north of the equator and east of the International Date Line. The Northeast Pacific is further divided into two sub-basins, namely the east and central Pacific. The east Pacific runs east of the 140th meridian west, and tropical cyclones occurring there are warned upon by the National Hurricane Center, the current Regional Specialized Meteorological Center (RSMC) for that area. The central Pacific, running from the 140th meridian west to the International Date Line, currently has the Central Pacific Hurricane Center as its RSMC. Tropical cyclones are generally much rarer in the central Pacific than in the east Pacific, with an average of just four to five storms forming or moving into the central Pacific compared to around 15 for the east Pacific. All tropical cyclones recorded by past and present RSMCs of the Northeast Pacific basin since 1949 are listed in the Northeast and North Central Pacific hurricane database (HURDAT), which is compiled and maintained by the National Hurricane Center.

Before 1970, tropical cyclones within the Northeast Pacific were classified into three categories: tropical depression, tropical storm, and hurricane; these were assigned intensities of 30 mph (48 km/h), 50 mph (80 km/h), and 85 mph (137 km/h) respectively. Exceptions to these rules would be storms that affected humans and as such humans were able to measure or estimate wind speeds or pressure data.

== Climatology ==
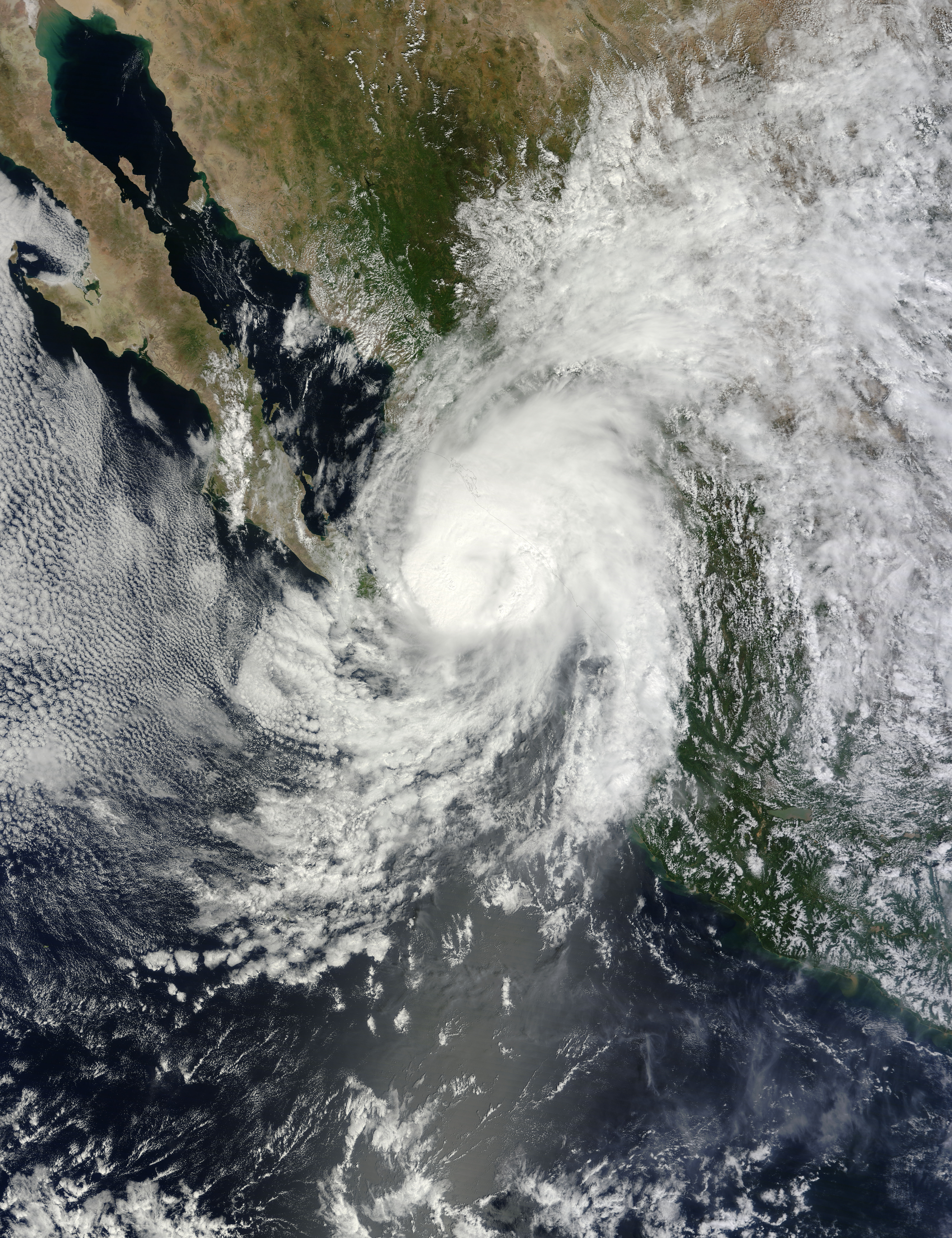
Hurricane Manuel of 2013, the second costliest tropical cyclone on record in the Northeastern Pacific

In the east Pacific and central Pacific sub-basins, hurricane season begins on May 15 and June 1, respectively, with both concluding on November 30. Since 1949, a total of 242 Category 1 hurricanes have developed in the Northeast Pacific basin. Only two have occurred in the off-season: Nina (1957) and Winnie (1983). In addition to those, seven systems have been at Category 1 intensity in May, 31 in June, 47 in July, 57 in August, 70 in September, 37 in October, and seven in November.

The majority of tropical cyclones form and organize in areas of warm sea surface temperatures, usually of at least 26.5 °C (79.7 °F) and low vertical wind shear; however, there are outliers to this general rule, such as storms that manage to intensify despite high amounts of vertical wind shear. When a pre-existing tropical disturbance – usually a tropical wave or a disturbance originating in the Intertropical Convergence Zone – enters an area where the aforementioned conditions are present, the disturbance can develop into a tropical cyclone, provided it is far enough from the equator to experience a sufficiently strong Coriolis force, which causes the counterclockwise rotation of hurricanes in the Northern Hemisphere. Between the months of December and April, sea surface temperatures in the tropics, where most Northeast Pacific tropical cyclones develop, are usually too low to support significant development. Also, the presence of a semi-permanent high-pressure area known as the North Pacific High in the eastern Pacific greatly reduces tropical cyclone development in the winter months, as the North Pacific High results in vertical wind shear that causes environmental conditions to be unconducive to tropical cyclone formation. Another factor preventing tropical cyclones from forming during the winter is the presence of a semi-permanent low-pressure area called the Aleutian Low between January and April. Its effects in the central Pacific near the 160th meridian west cause tropical waves that form in the area to move northward into the Gulf of Alaska. As the disturbances travel northward, they dissipate or transition into an extratropical cyclone. The Aleutian Low's retreat in late April allows the warmth of the Pacific High to meander in, bringing its powerful clockwise wind circulation with it. During the month of May, the Intertropical Convergence Zone migrates southward while vertical shear over the tropics decrease. As a result, the earliest tropical waves begin to form, coinciding with the start of the eastern Pacific hurricane season on May 15. During summer and early fall, sea surface temperatures rise further, reaching 29 °C (84 °F) in July and August, well above the 26.5 °C (79.7 °F) threshold for the formation and intensification of tropical cyclones. This allows for tropical cyclones developing during that time to strengthen significantly, perhaps even rapidly.

The El Niño-Southern Oscillation also influences the frequency and intensity of hurricanes in the Northeast Pacific basin. During El Niño events, sea surface temperatures increase in the Northeast Pacific and vertical wind shear decreases. Because of this, an increase in tropical cyclone activity occurs; the opposite happens in the Atlantic basin during El Niño, where increased wind shear creates an unfavorable environment for tropical cyclone formation. Contrary to El Niño, La Niña events increase wind shear and decreases sea surface temperatures over the eastern Pacific, while reducing wind shear and increasing sea surface temperatures over the Atlantic.

Within the Northeast Pacific, the easterly trade winds cause tropical cyclones to generally move westward out into the open Pacific Ocean. Only rarely do tropical cyclones forming during the peak months of the season make landfall. Closer to the end of the season, the subtropical ridge steers some storms northwards or northeastwards. Storms influenced by this ridge may bring impacts to the western coasts of Mexico and occasionally even Central America. In the central Pacific basin, the North Pacific High keeps tropical cyclones away from the Hawaiian Islands by forcing them southwards. Combined with cooler waters around the Hawaiian Islands that tend to weaken tropical cyclones that approach them, this makes direct impacts on the Hawaiian Islands by tropical cyclones rare.

== Systems ==
Key

- † Discontinuous duration (weakened below Category 1 then restrengthened to that classification at least once)
- ‡ Intensified past Category 1 intensity after exiting basin
- # Storm made landfall, see below for further information
- § Pressure listed was not at peak intensity (Note: Prior to 1988 for the Eastern Pacific and 2001 for the Central Pacific, pressure data was only able from direct measurements by reconnaissance aircraft that penetrated the storm or reports from ships and land-based weather stations, or estimates derived from satellite imagery. Should any reading or estimate be available, the lowest is listed below.)

=== 1949–1979 ===
Name	Dates as a Category 1 hurricane (Note: Dates are given in Coordinated Universal Time.)	Duration (hours)	Sustained wind speeds	Pressure	Areas affected	Deaths	Damage (USD) (Note: All damage values are in USD of their respective years.)	Refs
Four	September 9–11, 1949	54	85 mph (140 km/h)	Unknown	Baja California Peninsula#	—N/a	Unknown	
Six	September 29, 1949	12	85 mph (140 km/h)	Unknown	Socorro Island	—N/a	—N/a	
One	June 14–19, 1950	126	85 mph (140 km/h)	Unknown	Southwestern Mexico	—N/a	—N/a	
Two	July 3–6, 1950	78	85 mph (140 km/h)	Unknown	Southwestern Mexico, Baja California	—N/a	—N/a	
Three	July 9–12, 1950	78	85 mph (140 km/h)	Unknown	None	—N/a	—N/a	
Hiki	August 16–19, 1950	90	85 mph (140 km/h)	982 hPa (29.00 inHg)	Hawaii	1	$200 thousand	
Six	August 26–30, 1950	102	85 mph (140 km/h)	Unknown	None	—N/a	—N/a	
Seven	October 1–3, 1950	54	85 mph (140 km/h)	Unknown	None	—N/a	—N/a	
Two	June 1–2, 1951	30	85 mph (140 km/h)	Unknown	Southern Mexico#	—N/a	Unknown	
Eight	September 23–28, 1951	126	85 mph (140 km/h)	Unknown	None	—N/a	—N/a	
Four	July 24–27, 1952	78	85 mph (140 km/h)	Unknown	None	—N/a	—N/a	
Five	September 15–20, 1952	126	85 mph (140 km/h)	Unknown	Baja California, California	—N/a	—N/a	
Seven	October 13–15, 1952	54	85 mph (140 km/h)	Unknown	None	—N/a	—N/a	
Three	September 14–17, 1953	78	85 mph (140 km/h)	982 hPa (29.00 inHg)	Baja California Sur, Western Mexico	—N/a	—N/a	
Four	October 2–8, 1953	150	85 mph (140 km/h)	991 hPa (29.26 inHg)	Southwestern Mexico	—N/a	—N/a	
Three	July 12–17, 1954	138	85 mph (140 km/h)	Unknown	Baja California, California, Arizona#	—N/a	Unknown	
Four	July 25 – August 1, 1954	186	85 mph (140 km/h)	Unknown	None	—N/a	—N/a	
Nine	September 27 – October 1, 1954	102	85 mph (140 km/h)	Unknown	Southwestern Mexico	—N/a	—N/a	
Eleven	October 26 – November 1, 1954	150	85 mph (140 km/h)	Unknown	Guatemala, Southern Mexico	—N/a	—N/a	
One	June 6–8, 1955	66	85 mph (140 km/h)	990 hPa (29.23 inHg)	None	—N/a	—N/a	
Six	October 15–16, 1955	30	85 mph (140 km/h)	999 hPa (29.50 inHg)§	Southwestern Mexico#	—N/a	Unknown	
One	May 18–19, 1956	30	85 mph (140 km/h)	979 hPa (28.91 inHg)	None	—N/a	—N/a	
Three	June 9, 1956	18	85 mph (140 km/h)	985 hPa (29.09 inHg)	Southwestern Mexico	—N/a	—N/a	
Four	June 12–14, 1956	42	85 mph (140 km/h)	984 hPa (29.06 inHg)	Southern Mexico#	—N/a	Unknown	
Five	July 9–12, 1956	78	85 mph (140 km/h)	999 hPa (29.50 inHg)§	None	—N/a	—N/a	
Seven	August 22–25, 1956	72†	85 mph (140 km/h)	997 hPa (29.44 inHg)§	None	—N/a	—N/a	
Nine	September 4–6, 1956	66	85 mph (140 km/h)	990 hPa (29.23 inHg)	None	—N/a	—N/a	
Ten	September 12–17, 1956	114	85 mph (140 km/h)	986 hPa (29.12 inHg)	Southwestern Mexico	—N/a	—N/a	
Kanoa	July 15–26, 1957	270	85 mph (140 km/h)	985 hPa (29.09 inHg)	Hawaii	—N/a	—N/a	
Three	August 9–15, 1957	162	85 mph (140 km/h)	972 hPa (28.70 inHg)	None	—N/a	—N/a	
Della	September 4–9, 1957	132	85 mph (140 km/h)‡	980 hPa (28.94 inHg)	Hawaii	—N/a	—N/a	
Six	September 17–18, 1957	48	85 mph (140 km/h)	984 hPa (29.06 inHg)	Southern Mexico#	7	Unknown	
Ten	October 1–5, 1957	102	85 mph (140 km/h)	996 hPa (29.41 inHg)§	Baja California Peninsula, Western Mexico	2	Unknown	
Eleven	October 17–20, 1957	66	85 mph (140 km/h)	986 hPa (29.12 inHg)	Southwestern Mexico	—N/a	—N/a	
Nina	November 30 – December 5, 1957	144	85 mph (140 km/h)	< 1002 hPa (29.59 inHg)§	Hawaii	4	$100 thousand	
One	June 6–15, 1958	216†	85 mph (140 km/h)	995 hPa (29.38 inHg)	Baja California Sur, Southwestern Mexico	—N/a	—N/a	
Three	July 19–21, 1958	66	85 mph (140 km/h)	1002 hPa (29.59 inHg)§	None	—N/a	—N/a	
Four	July 21–25, 1958	102	85 mph (140 km/h)	1005 hPa (29.68 inHg)§	None	—N/a	—N/a	
June	September 20, 1958	12	75 mph (120 km/h)	963 hPa (28.44 inHg)	None	—N/a	—N/a	
Eleven	September 30 – October 5, 1958	126	85 mph (140 km/h)	960 hPa (28.35 inHg)	Baja California Peninsula, Western Mexico, New Mexico#	—N/a	Unknown	
Ten	September 4–11, 1959	174	85 mph (140 km/h)	987 hPa (29.15 inHg)	Southwestern Mexico, Baja California Peninsula, California#	—N/a	Unknown	
Twelve	September 21–26, 1959	114	85 mph (140 km/h)	967 hPa (28.56 inHg)	None	—N/a	—N/a	
Celeste	July 20–22, 1960	60	85 mph (140 km/h)	994 hPa (29.35 inHg)	Southwest Mexico	—N/a	—N/a	
Diana	August 17–20, 1960	84†	85 mph (140 km/h)	987 hPa (29.15 inHg)§	Western Mexico, Baja California	—N/a	—N/a	
Estelle	August 29 – September 9, 1960	282	85 mph (140 km/h)	977 hPa (28.85 inHg)	Guatemala, Southern Mexico, Southern California	—N/a	—N/a	
Fernanda	September 3–8, 1960	138	85 mph (140 km/h)	999 hPa (29.50 inHg)§	Guatemala, Southwestern Mexico	—N/a	—N/a	
Gwen	October 4–5, 1960	Unknown	85 mph (140 km/h)	1000 hPa (29.53 inHg)§	None	—N/a	—N/a	
Hyacinth	October 21–23, 1960	42	85 mph (140 km/h)	989 hPa (29.21 inHg)	Southwestern Mexico#	—N/a	Unknown	
Iva	June 9–11, 1961	42	85 mph (140 km/h)	984 hPa (29.06 inHg)	Southern Mexico#	—N/a	Unknown	
Tara	November 10–12, 1961	66	85 mph (140 km/h)	996 hPa (29.41 inHg)	Southern Mexico#	436	$16 million	
Valerie	June 24–25, 1962	54	85 mph (140 km/h)	1003 hPa (29.62 inHg)§	Southwestern Mexico#	—N/a	Unknown	
Doreen	October 1–4, 1962	90	85 mph (140 km/h)	980 hPa (28.94 inHg)	Baja California Sur, Western Mexico, New Mexico, Arizona, West Texas#	—N/a	Unknown	
Emily	June 29–30, 1963	42	85 mph (140 km/h)	996 hPa (29.41 inHg)	Southern Mexico#	—N/a	Unknown	
Florence	July 14–17, 1963	78	85 mph (140 km/h)	996 hPa (29.41 inHg)	None	—N/a	—N/a	
Glenda	July 19–21, 1963	54	85 mph (140 km/h)	997 hPa (29.44 inHg)	None	—N/a	—N/a	
Mona	October 17–19, 1963	42	85 mph (140 km/h)	961 hPa (28.38 inHg)	Western Mexico#	—N/a	Unknown	
Emily	August 31 – September 1, 1965	24	90 mph (150 km/h)	983 hPa (29.03 inHg)	Baja California#	—N/a	Unknown	
Adele	June 23–24, 1966	30	85 mph (140 km/h)	982 hPa (29.00 inHg)	Southern Mexico#	—N/a	Extensive	
Blanca	August 5, 1966	18	85 mph (140 km/h)	990 hPa (29.23 inHg)	None	—N/a	—N/a	
Connie	August 13–15, 1966	54	85 mph (140 km/h)	981 hPa (28.97 inHg)	Hawaii	—N/a	—N/a	
Dolores	August 18–19, 1966	24	85 mph (140 km/h)	981 hPa (28.97 inHg)	None	—N/a	—N/a	
Eileen	August 26–27, 1966	36	85 mph (140 km/h)	990 hPa (29.23 inHg)	None	—N/a	—N/a	
Francesca	September 6–9, 1966	72	85 mph (140 km/h)	992 hPa (29.29 inHg)	California	—N/a	—N/a	
Helga	September 12–14, 1966	36	85 mph (140 km/h)	992 hPa (29.29 inHg)	Baja California, California, Western Mexico#	1	Unknown	
Carlotta	June 24–25, 1967	42	85 mph (140 km/h)	Unknown	Western Mexico	—N/a	—N/a	
Jewel	August 19, 1967	24	85 mph (140 km/h)	997 hPa (29.44 inHg)	None	—N/a	—N/a	
Katrina	August 31 – September 2, 1967	60	85 mph (140 km/h)	Unknown	Baja California, Western Mexico, Arizona#	1	Extensive	
Lily	September 6–9, 1967	78	85 mph (140 km/h)	981 hPa (28.97 inHg)	None	—N/a	—N/a	
Priscilla	October 16–18, 1967	54	85 mph (140 km/h)	Unknown	None	—N/a	—N/a	
Fernanda	August 8–9, 1968	36	85 mph (140 km/h)	1000 hPa (29.53 inHg)§	None	—N/a	—N/a	
Joanne	August 24–25, 1968	36	85 mph (140 km/h)	986 hPa (29.12 inHg)	None	—N/a	—N/a	
Liza	August 29 – September 2, 1968	84	85 mph (140 km/h)	998 hPa (29.47 inHg)	California	—N/a	$5 thousand	
Naomi	September 11–13, 1968	36	85 mph (140 km/h)	979 hPa (28.91 inHg)	Mexico, Texas#	4	$16 million	
Pauline	September 30 – October 2, 1968	48	85 mph (140 km/h)	1002 hPa (29.59 inHg)	Mexico, Southwestern United States#	5	—N/a	
Rebecca	October 8–9, 1968	18	85 mph (140 km/h)	965 hPa (28.50 inHg)	Mexico	—N/a	—N/a	
Bernice	July 12–14, 1969	48	85 mph (140 km/h)	1004 hPa (29.65 inHg)	None	—N/a	—N/a	
Doreen	August 5–6, 1969	30	85 mph (140 km/h)	993 hPa (29.32 inHg)	None	—N/a	—N/a	
Glenda	September 10, 1969	6	75 mph (120 km/h)	993 hPa (29.32 inHg)	Mexico	—N/a	—N/a	
Jeniffer	October 10–11, 1969	42	75 mph (120 km/h)	991 hPa (29.26 inHg)	Western Mexico#	1	Extensive	
Adele	June 1–3, 1970	72	85 mph (140 km/h)	992 hPa (29.29 inHg)	None	—N/a	—N/a	
Dot	September 3, 1970	12	80 mph (130 km/h)	993 hPa (29.32 inHg)	None	—N/a	—N/a	
Carlotta	July 3–4, 1971	24	85 mph (140 km/h)	980 hPa (28.94 inHg)	None	—N/a	—N/a	
Lily	August 30–31, 1971	24	85 mph (140 km/h)	980 hPa (28.94 inHg)	Southwestern Mexico#	12–14	Unknown	
Annette	June 4–5, 1972	24	85 mph (140 km/h)	993 hPa (29.32 inHg)	Southwestern Mexico#	—N/a	—N/a	
Estelle	August 19, 1972	24	80 mph (130 km/h)	1004 hPa (29.65 inHg)§	None	—N/a	—N/a	
Ruby	November 14, 1972‡	6	80 mph (130 km/h)	Unknown	None	—N/a	—N/a	
Florence	July 29, 1973	18	90 mph (150 km/h)	990 hPa (29.23 inHg)	None	—N/a	—N/a	
Lillian	October 7–9, 1973	30	85 mph (140 km/h)	990 hPa (29.23 inHg)	None	—N/a	—N/a	
Dolores	June 16, 1974	24	80 mph (130 km/h)	973 hPa (28.73 inHg)	Southwestern Mexico#	18–28	$4 million	
Francesca	July 18–19, 1974	18	75 mph (120 km/h)	973 hPa (28.73 inHg)	None	—N/a	—N/a	
Joyce	August 24–25, 1974	36	85 mph (140 km/h)	973 hPa (28.73 inHg)	None	—N/a	—N/a	
Kirsten	August 23–25, 1974	42	85 mph (140 km/h)	973 hPa (28.73 inHg)	None	—N/a	—N/a	
Norma	September 10, 1974	6	75 mph (120 km/h)	978 hPa (28.88 inHg)	Southwestern Mexico#	3	—N/a	
Patricia	October 7–11, 1974	90	90 mph (150 km/h)	964 hPa (28.47 inHg)	None	—N/a	—N/a	
Agatha	June 4, 1975	12	80 mph (130 km/h)	1005 hPa (29.68 inHg)§	Southwestern Mexico	—N/a	Unknown	
Jewel	August 27, 1975	6	75 mph (120 km/h)	Unknown	None	—N/a	—N/a	
Twelve	September 4–5, 1975	18	75 mph (120 km/h)	990 hPa (29.23 inHg)	British Columbia, Yukon, Alaska, Washington, Oregon	—N/a	—N/a	
Lily	September 18–20, 1975	48	85 mph (140 km/h)	Unknown	Socorro Island	—N/a	—N/a	
Bonnie	June 27, 1976	18	75 mph (120 km/h)	987 hPa (29.15 inHg)	None	—N/a	—N/a	
Kathleen	September 10, 1976	6	80 mph (130 km/h)	986 hPa (29.12 inHg)	Baja California Peninsula, Southern California, Arizona, Nevada#	12	$160 million	
Claudia	July 4, 1977	18	90 mph (150 km/h)	Unknown	None	—N/a	—N/a	
Doreen	August 14–16, 1977	36	75 mph (120 km/h)	979 hPa (28.91 inHg)	Mexico, Southwestern United States#	8	$25 million	
Heather	October 5–6, 1977	36	85 mph (140 km/h)	978 hPa (28.88 inHg)	Baja California Peninsula, Arizona	—N/a	$14.6 million	
Aletta	May 31, 1978	6	75 mph (120 km/h)	Unknown	Southwestern Mexico#	—N/a	Unknown	
Iva	August 13, 1978	18	75 mph (120 km/h)	Unknown	Hawaii	—N/a	—N/a	
Miriam	August 28–29, 1978	24	90 mph (150 km/h)	Unknown	None	—N/a	—N/a	
Olivia	September 22, 1978	18	75 mph (120 km/h)	Unknown	Central America#	Unknown	Unknown	
Rosa	October 4–5, 1978	42	85 mph (140 km/h)	Unknown	Baja California Sur	—N/a	—N/a	
Guillermo	September 11–12, 1979	12	75 mph (120 km/h)	994 hPa (29.35 inHg)	None	—N/a	—N/a	
Overall reference for name, dates, duration, winds and pressure:

=== 1980–1999 ===
Key

- † Discontinuous duration (weakened below Category 1 then restrengthened to that classification at least once)
- ‡ Intensified past Category 1 intensity after exiting basin
- # Storm made landfall, see below for further information
- § Pressure listed was not at peak intensity

Name	Dates as a Category 1 hurricane	Duration (hours)	Sustained wind speeds	Pressure	Areas affected	Deaths	Damage (USD)	Refs
Celia	June 26–28, 1980	48	75 mph (120 km/h)	Unknown	None	—N/a	—N/a	
Georgette	July 29, 1980	6	75 mph (120 km/h)	Unknown	None	—N/a	—N/a	
Beatriz	June 30 – July 3, 1981	60	85 mph (140 km/h)	Unknown	None	—N/a	—N/a	
Dora	July 13–15, 1981	66	90 mph (150 km/h)	979 hPa (28.91 inHg)	None	—N/a	—N/a	
Greg	August 20, 1981	12	75 mph (120 km/h)	Unknown	None	—N/a	—N/a	
Hilary	August 25–26, 1981	30	85 mph (140 km/h)	Unknown	Socorro Island	—N/a	—N/a	
Jova	September 15–18, 1981	66	85 mph (140 km/h)	Unknown	Hawaii	—N/a	—N/a	
Otis	October 26–29, 1981	72	85 mph (140 km/h)	Unknown	Southwestern Mexico#	—N/a	—N/a	
Fabio	July 19–20, 1982	72	80 mph (130 km/h)	Unknown	None	—N/a	—N/a	
Hector	July 30–31, 1982	30	75 mph (120 km/h)	Unknown	None	—N/a	—N/a	
Kristy	August 10–15, 1982†	60	90 mph (150 km/h)	982 hPa (29.00 inHg)	None	—N/a	—N/a	
Miriam	August 31 – September 4, 1982	96	85 mph (140 km/h)	Unknown	None	—N/a	—N/a	
Iwa	November 23–24, 1982	42	90 mph (150 km/h)	968 hPa (28.59 inHg)	Hawaii	4	$312 million	
Gil	July 26–29, 1983	78	90 mph (150 km/h)	Unknown	Hawaii	1	Minimal	
Winnie	December 6, 1983	24	90 mph (150 km/h)	Unknown	Southwestern Mexico	—N/a	—N/a	
Boris	May 30, 1984	6	75 mph (120 km/h)	Unknown	None	—N/a	—N/a	
Lowell	August 27–29, 1984	36	85 mph (140 km/h)	Unknown	None	—N/a	—N/a	
Marie	September 7–9, 1984	60	90 mph (150 km/h)	Unknown	None	—N/a	—N/a	
Marty	August 9, 1985	18	75 mph (120 km/h)	Unknown	None	—N/a	—N/a	
Olaf	August 26–28, 1985	54	85 mph (140 km/h)	Unknown	None	—N/a	—N/a	
Pauline	September 4–8, 1985	96	85 mph (140 km/h)	Unknown	None	—N/a	—N/a	
Nele	October 25–30, 1985	114	90 mph (150 km/h)	982 hPa (29.00 inHg)	Hawaii	—N/a	—N/a	
Agatha	May 26, 1986	18	75 mph (120 km/h)	Unknown	Southwestern Mexico	—N/a	—N/a	
Celia	June 27–29, 1986	42	85 mph (140 km/h)	Unknown	None	—N/a	—N/a	
Frank	July 30 – August 1, 1986	60	85 mph (140 km/h)	Unknown	None	—N/a	—N/a	
Newton	September 21–23, 1986	66	85 mph (140 km/h)	982 hPa (29.00 inHg)	Baja California Sur, Southwestern Mexico#	—N/a	Minimal	
Orlene	September 22–23, 1986	42	80 mph (130 km/h)	Unknown	None	—N/a	—N/a	
Greg	July 31 – August 1, 1987	24	80 mph (130 km/h)	Unknown	Southwestern Mexico	—N/a	Unknown	
Lidia	September 1–2, 1987	24	85 mph (140 km/h)	Unknown	None	—N/a	—N/a	
Norma	September 17, 1987	12	75 mph (120 km/h)	Unknown	Baja California Sur	—N/a	—N/a	
Carlotta	July 11–12, 1988	18	75 mph (120 km/h)	987 hPa (29.15 inHg)	None	—N/a	—N/a	
Kristy	August 31 – September 2, 1988	60	90 mph (150 km/h)	976 hPa (28.82 inHg)	Southwestern Mexico	—N/a	—N/a	
Barbara	June 18, 1989	24	80 mph (130 km/h)	984 hPa (29.06 inHg)	None	—N/a	—N/a	
Cosme	June 21–22, 1989	24	85 mph (140 km/h)	979 hPa (28.91 inHg)	Mexico, East Texas#	30	Unknown	
Dalilia	July 13–19, 1989	144	90 mph (150 km/h)	977 hPa (28.85 inHg)	Hawaii	—N/a	Minimal	
Gil	July 31 – August 2, 1989	36	85 mph (140 km/h)	979 hPa (28.91 inHg)	Southwestern Mexico	—N/a	—N/a	
Lorena	September 1, 1989	12	75 mph (120 km/h)	989 hPa (29.21 inHg)	None	—N/a	—N/a	
Alma	May 15–16, 1990	30	85 mph (140 km/h)	979 hPa (28.91 inHg)	None	—N/a	—N/a	
Boris	June 5–6, 1990	36	90 mph (150 km/h)	977 hPa (28.85 inHg)	Baja California Peninsula, Northwestern Mexico	—N/a	—N/a	
Elida	June 28–29, 1990	36	80 mph (130 km/h)	990 hPa (29.23 inHg)	Revillagigedo Island	—N/a	—N/a	
Fausto	July 8–10, 1990	54	85 mph (140 km/h)	979 hPa (28.91 inHg)	None	—N/a	—N/a	
Kenna	August 25–27, 1990	72	85 mph (140 km/h)	980 hPa (28.94 inHg)	None	—N/a	—N/a	
Lowell	August 27–28, 1990	36	75 mph (120 km/h)	986 hPa (29.12 inHg)	None	—N/a	—N/a	
Norbert	September 14–15, 1990	42	80 mph (130 km/h)	983 hPa (29.03 inHg)	None	—N/a	—N/a	
Polo	September 30, 1990	12	75 mph (120 km/h)	987 hPa (29.15 inHg)	None	—N/a	—N/a	
Delores	June 25–26, 1991	42	85 mph (140 km/h)	979 hPa (28.91 inHg)	Guerrero, Colima	—N/a	—N/a	
Enrique	July 17, 1991	6	75 mph (120 km/h)	987 hPa (29.15 inHg)	None	—N/a	—N/a	
Guillermo	October 5–7, 1991	48	80 mph (130 km/h)	983 hPa (29.03 inHg)	None	—N/a	—N/a	
Marty	October 10–12, 1991	60	80 mph (130 km/h)	979 hPa (28.91 inHg)	Guerrero, Colima	—N/a	—N/a	
Javier	August 5–6, 1992	30	80 mph (130 km/h)	985 hPa (29.09 inHg)	None	—N/a	—N/a	
Lester	August 22–23, 1992	18	80 mph (130 km/h)	985 hPa (29.09 inHg)	Baja California, Northwestern Mexico, Southwestern United States#	3	$3 million	
Paine	September 13–14, 1992	24	75 mph (120 km/h)	987 hPa (29.15 inHg)	None	—N/a	—N/a	
Seymour	September 19–23, 1992	66†	85 mph (140 km/h)	980 hPa (28.94 inHg)	None	—N/a	—N/a	
Adrian	June 15–16, 1993	36	85 mph (140 km/h)	979 hPa (28.91 inHg)	None	—N/a	—N/a	
Li	August 12, 1994	6	75 mph (120 km/h)	1007 hPa (29.74 inHg)	None	—N/a	—N/a	
Ileana	August 12–13, 1994	12	75 mph (120 km/h)	986 hPa (29.12 inHg)	None	—N/a	—N/a	
Cosme	July 19–20, 1995	18	75 mph (120 km/h)	985 hPa (29.09 inHg)	None	—N/a	—N/a	
Flossie	October 10–12, 1995	48	80 mph (130 km/h)	978 hPa (28.88 inHg)	Baja California Peninsula	1	$5 million	
Ismael	September 14–15, 1995	24	80 mph (130 km/h)	986 hPa (29.12 inHg)	Northern Mexico#	116	$26 million	
Boris	June 29–30, 1996	24	90 mph (150 km/h)	979 hPa (28.91 inHg)	Mexico#	10	—N/a	
Hernan	October 2–3, 1996	30	85 mph (140 km/h)	980 hPa (28.94 inHg)	Western Mexico, Texas#	1	—N/a	
Dolores	July 7–10, 1997	66	90 mph (150 km/h)	975 hPa (28.79 inHg)	None	—N/a	—N/a	
Isis	September 2–3, 1998	12	75 mph (120 km/h)	988 hPa (29.18 inHg)	Baja California Peninsula, Northern Pacific Coast of Mexico, Southwestern United States, Northwestern United States#	14	$10 million	
Kay	October 13–14, 1998	12	75 mph (120 km/h)	987 hPa (29.15 inHg)	None	—N/a	—N/a	
Madeline	October 17–19, 1998	42	85 mph (140 km/h)	979 hPa (28.91 inHg)	Mexico, Baja California Peninsula, Texas	31	$750 million	
Greg	September 6–7, 1999	24	75 mph (120 km/h)	986 hPa (29.12 inHg)	Western Mexico, Baja California Peninsula#	10	—N/a	
Hilary	October 20, 1999	12	75 mph (120 km/h)	987 hPa (29.15 inHg)	Baja California Peninsula	—N/a	—N/a	
Overall reference for name, dates, duration, winds and pressure:

=== 2000–2019 ===
Key

- † Discontinuous duration (weakened below Category 1 then restrengthened to that classification at least once)
- ‡ Intensified past Category 1 intensity after exiting basin
- # Storm made landfall, see below for further information
- § Pressure listed was not at peak intensity

Name	Dates as a Category 1 hurricane	Duration (hours)	Sustained wind speeds	Pressure	Areas affected	Deaths	Damage (USD)	Refs
Gilma	August 8, 2000	18	80 mph (130 km/h)	983 hPa (29.03 inHg)	None	—N/a	—N/a	
Hector	August 14–15, 2000	30	80 mph (130 km/h)	983 hPa (29.03 inHg)	None	—N/a	—N/a	
Dalila	July 24, 2001	6	75 mph (120 km/h)	987 hPa (29.15 inHg)	Southwestern Mexico, Baja California Peninsula	1	$1 million	
Kiko	September 23, 2001	6	75 mph (120 km/h)	990 hPa (29.23 inHg)	None	—N/a	—N/a	
Narda	October 21–22, 2001	30	85 mph (140 km/h)	980 hPa (28.94 inHg)	None	—N/a	—N/a	
Octave	November 1–2, 2001	24	85 mph (140 km/h)	980 hPa (28.94 inHg)	None	—N/a	—N/a	
Huko	October 28 – November 3, 2002	102†	85 mph (140 km/h)	980 hPa (28.94 inHg)	None	—N/a	—N/a	
Linda	September 15, 2003	12	75 mph (120 km/h)	987 hPa (29.15 inHg)	None	—N/a	—N/a	
Olaf	October 5, 2003	6	75 mph (120 km/h)	987 hPa (29.15 inHg)	Mexico#	—N/a	Minimal	
Patricia	October 21–22, 2003	24	80 mph (130 km/h)	984 hPa (29.06 inHg)	None	—N/a	—N/a	
Celia	July 22, 2004	18	85 mph (140 km/h)	981 hPa (28.97 inHg)	None	—N/a	—N/a	
Frank	August 23–25, 2004	36	85 mph (140 km/h)	979 hPa (28.91 inHg)	Baja California Peninsula	—N/a	—N/a	
Isis	September 15, 2004	6	75 mph (120 km/h)	987 hPa (29.15 inHg)	None	—N/a	—N/a	
Adrian	May 19, 2005	6	80 mph (130 km/h)	982 hPa (29.00 inHg)	Guatemala, El Salvador, Nicaragua, Honduras #	5	$12 million	
Fernanda	August 11–14, 2005	72	85 mph (140 km/h)	978 hPa (28.88 inHg)	None	—N/a	—N/a	
Max	September 20–21, 2005	30	85 mph (140 km/h)	981 hPa (28.97 inHg)	None	—N/a	—N/a	
Carlotta	July 13–15, 2006	48†	85 mph (140 km/h)	981 hPa (28.97 inHg)	None	—N/a	—N/a	
Kristy	August 31 – September 1, 2006	24	80 mph (130 km/h)	985 hPa (29.09 inHg)	None	—N/a	—N/a	
Cosme	July 16, 2007	6	75 mph (120 km/h)	987 hPa (29.15 inHg)	Hawaii	—N/a	Minimal	
Henriette	September 4–5, 2007	42	85 mph (140 km/h)	972 hPa (28.70 inHg)	Southwestern Mexico, Western Mexico, Northwestern Mexico, Baja California Peninsula #	11	$25 million	
Ivo	September 20–21, 2007	42	80 mph (130 km/h)	984 hPa (29.06 inHg)	Baja California Peninsula	—N/a	—N/a	
Boris	July 1–2, 2008	36†	80 mph (130 km/h)	985 hPa (29.09 inHg)	None	—N/a	—N/a	
Fausto	July 18–21, 2008	78	90 mph (150 km/h)	977 hPa (28.85 inHg)	Clarion Island, Socorro Island	—N/a	Minimal	
Genevieve	July 25–26, 2008	18	75 mph (120 km/h)	987 hPa (29.15 inHg)	Hawaii	—N/a	—N/a	
Marie	October 3–4, 2008	24	80 mph (130 km/h)	984 hPa (29.06 inHg)	None	—N/a	—N/a	
Andres	June 23, 2009	18	80 mph (130 km/h)	984 hPa (29.06 inHg)	Southwestern Mexico, Western Mexico, Honduras	5	$231 thousand	
Linda	September 9–10, 2009	30	80 mph (130 km/h)	985 hPa (29.09 inHg)	None	—N/a	—N/a	
Frank	August 25–27, 2010	54	90 mph (150 km/h)	978 hPa (28.88 inHg)	Southwestern Mexico, Western Mexico	6	$8.3 million	
Beatriz	June 20–21, 2011	18	90 mph (150 km/h)	977 hPa (28.85 inHg)	Southwestern Mexico, Western Mexico	4	Minimal	
Calvin	July 8–9, 2011	18	80 mph (130 km/h)	984 hPa (29.06 inHg)	None	—N/a	—N/a	
Greg	August 18–19, 2011	36	85 mph (140 km/h)	979 hPa (28.91 inHg)	None	—N/a	—N/a	
Gilma	August 8–9, 2012	24	80 mph (130 km/h)	984 hPa (29.06 inHg)	None	—N/a	—N/a	
Ileana	August 30–31, 2012	42	85 mph (140 km/h)	978 hPa (28.88 inHg)	None	—N/a	—N/a	
Lane	September 17–18, 2012	30	85 mph (140 km/h)	985 hPa (29.09 inHg)	None	—N/a	—N/a	
Barbara	May 29, 2013	6	80 mph (130 km/h)	983 hPa (29.03 inHg)	Central America, Southwestern Mexico, Eastern Mexico#	5	$1 million	
Cosme	June 25–26, 2013	30	85 mph (140 km/h)	980 hPa (28.94 inHg)	Western Mexico, Baja California Peninsula	3	Minimal	
Dalila	July 2–3, 2013	30	80 mph (130 km/h)	984 hPa (29.06 inHg)	Southwestern Mexico, Western Mexico	—N/a	Minimal	
Erick	July 6–7, 2013	36	80 mph (130 km/h)	983 hPa (29.03 inHg)	Southwestern Mexico, Western Mexico, Baja California Peninsula	2	Moderate	
Gil	July 31 – August 2, 2013	48	85 mph (140 km/h)	985 hPa (29.09 inHg)	None	—N/a	—N/a	
Kiko	September 1, 2013	12	75 mph (120 km/h)	989 hPa (29.21 inHg)	Baja California Peninsula	—N/a	—N/a	
Manuel	September 19, 2013	18	75 mph (120 km/h)	983 hPa (29.03 inHg)	Mexico, Texas#	123	$4.2 billion	
Hernan	July 27–28, 2014	12	75 mph (120 km/h)	992 hPa (29.29 inHg)	None	—N/a	—N/a	
Karina	August 14–24, 2014	42†	75 mph (120 km/h)	983 hPa (29.03 inHg)	None	—N/a	—N/a	
Lowell	August 21, 2014	12	85 mph (140 km/h)	980 hPa (28.94 inHg)	None	—N/a	—N/a	
Polo	September 18, 2014	18	75 mph (120 km/h)	979 hPa (28.91 inHg)	Western Mexico, Baja California Peninsula	1	$7.5 million	
Rachel	September 27–29, 2014	36	85 mph (140 km/h)	980 hPa (28.94 inHg)	None	—N/a	—N/a	
Ana	October 17–25, 2014	78†	85 mph (140 km/h)	985 hPa (29.09 inHg)	Hawaii, Western Canada, Alaskan Panhandle	—N/a	Minimal	
Carlos	June 13–17, 2015	72†	90 mph (150 km/h)	978 hPa (28.88 inHg)	Southwestern and Western Mexico#	—N/a	$1 million	
Loke	August 24–25, 2015	24	75 mph (120 km/h)	985 hPa (29.09 inHg)	Hawaii	—N/a	—N/a	
Marty	September 28–29, 2015	18	80 mph (130 km/h)	987 hPa (29.15 inHg)	Southwestern and Western Mexico	—N/a	$30 million	
Frank	July 26–27, 2016	18	85 mph (140 km/h)	979 hPa (28.91 inHg)	Baja California Peninsula, Nayarit	—N/a	—N/a	
Newton	September 5–7, 2016	42	90 mph (150 km/h)	977 hPa (28.85 inHg)	Baja California Peninsula, Northwestern Mexico, Southwestern United States#	9	$9.6 million	
Paine	September 19–20, 2016	24	90 mph (150 km/h)	979 hPa (28.91 inHg)	Baja California Peninsula, Southwestern United States	—N/a	Minimal	
Ulika	September 28, 2016	12	75 mph (120 km/h)	992 hPa (29.29 inHg)	None	—N/a	—N/a	
Irwin	July 25–26, 2017	36	90 mph (150 km/h)	979 hPa (28.91 inHg)	None	—N/a	—N/a	
Max	September 14, 2017	12	90 mph (150 km/h)	980 hPa (28.94 inHg)	Southern Mexico#	1	$19.8 million	
Norma	September 16, 2017	12	75 mph (120 km/h)	985 hPa (29.09 inHg)	Baja California Peninsula	—N/a	—N/a	
Alvin	June 28, 2019	6	75 mph (120 km/h)	992 hPa (29.29 inHg)	None	—N/a	—N/a	
Flossie	July 30–31, 2019	23	80 mph (130 km/h)	990 hPa (29.23 inHg)	Hawaii	—N/a	—N/a	
Lorena	September 18, 2019	12	80 mph (130 km/h)	990 hPa (29.23 inHg)	Southwestern Mexico, Revillagigedo Islands, Baja California Peninsula#	—N/a	—N/a	
Overall reference for name, dates, duration, winds and pressure:

=== 2020–present ===
Key

- † Discontinuous duration (weakened below Category 1 then restrengthened to that classification at least once)
- ‡ Intensified past Category 1 intensity after exiting basin
- # Storm made landfall, see below for further information
- § Pressure listed was not at peak intensity

Name	Dates as a Category 1 hurricane	Duration (hours)	Sustained wind speeds	Pressure	Areas affected	Deaths	Damage (USD)	Refs
Enrique	June 26–28, 2021	54	90 mph (150 km/h)	975 hPa (28.79 inHg)	Southwestern Mexico, Baja California Peninsula#	3	—N/a	
Hilda	August 1–3, 2021	60	85 mph (140 km/h)	985 hPa (29.09 inHg)	None	—N/a	—N/a	
Nora	August 28–29, 2021	30	85 mph (140 km/h)	977 hPa (28.85 inHg)	Western Mexico#	3	$125 million	
Pamela	October 12–13, 2021	12	75 mph (120 km/h)	987 hPa (29.15 inHg)	Western Mexico#	3	$10 million	
Blas	June 15–18, 2022	66	90 mph (150 km/h)	976 hPa (28.82 inHg)	Southwestern Mexico	4	Minimal	
Estelle	July 17–19, 2022	54	85 mph (140 km/h)	984 hPa (29.06 inHg)	Revillagigedo Islands	—N/a	—N/a	
Frank	July 30 – August 1, 2022	54	90 mph (150 km/h)	975 hPa (28.79 inHg)	None	—N/a	—N/a	
Howard	August 8–10, 2022	30	85 mph (140 km/h)	983 hPa (29.03 inHg)	Revillagigedo Islands	—N/a	—N/a	
Beatriz	June 30 – July 1, 2023	18	85 mph (140 km/h)	991 hPa (29.26 inHg)	Western Mexico	1	Minimal	
Carlotta	July 31 – August 4, 2024	42	90 mph (150 km/h)	979 hPa (28.91 inHg)	Clarion Island	—N/a	—N/a	
Hone	August 22–26, 2024	18	90 mph (150 km/h)	988 hPa (29.18 inHg)	Hawaii	—N/a	$8.05 million	
Barbara	June 9–10, 2025	18	75 mph (120 km/h)	991 hPa (29.26 inHg)	Southwestern Mexico	—N/a	—N/a	
Gil	August 2, 2025	18	75 mph (120 km/h)	991 hPa (29.26 inHg)	None	—N/a	—N/a	
Henriette	August 10–12, 2025	36	85 mph (140 km/h)	986 hPa (29.12 inHg)	None	—N/a	—N/a	
Lorena	September 3–4, 2025	30	85 mph (140 km/h)	981 hPa (28.97 inHg)	None	—N/a	$1 million	
Octave	October 5–6, 2025	30	90 mph (150 km/h)	980 hPa (28.94 inHg)	None	—N/a	—N/a	
Overall reference for name, dates, duration, winds and pressure:

== Landfalls ==
Landfalls by month
Month	Number of storms
May	3
June	10
July	1
August	6
September	26
October	16
November	1

Out of the 237 Category 1 hurricanes in the east and central Pacific, 47 have made landfall as a tropical cyclone, collectively resulting in 63 landfalls. As tropical cyclones tend to weaken before landfall due to the effects of land interaction, only 34 Category 1 hurricanes actually made landfall while still at Category 1 strength. Fourteen storms made two landfalls and one made three. Multiple Category 1 hurricanes made landfall only in 10 years; there were no more than two landfalling storms in a single year.

Name	Year	Category 1	Tropical storm	Tropical depression	Refs
Four	1949	Baja California Sur state (September 11)	—	—	
Two	1951	Guerrero state (June 1)	—	—	
Three	1954	Baja California Sur state (July 17)	—	—	
Six	1955	Jalisco state (October 16)	—	—	
Six	1957	Guerrero state (September 18)	—	—	
Ten	1957	Baja California Sur state (October 4), Sonora state (October 5)	—	—	
Eleven	1958	Baja California Sur state (October 4), Sonora state (October 5)	—	—	
Ten	1959	Baja California Sur state (October 3, October 4)	Baja California state (October 5)	—	
Iva	1961	Guerrero state (June 11)	—	—	
Tara	1961	Guerrero state (November 12)	—	—	
Valerie	1962	Sinaloa state (June 25)	—	—	
Doreen	1962	Sinaloa state (October 4)	—	—	
Emily	1963	Guerrero state (June 30)	—	—	
Mona	1963	Sinaloa state (October 18)	—	—	
Emily	1965	—	—	Baja California state (September 5)	
Adele	1966	Michoacán state (June 24)	—	—	
Helga	1966	—	Baja California Sur state (September 15)	Sonora state (September 16)	
Katrina	1967	Baja California Sur state (August 31)	Sinaloa state (September 2)	—	
Naomi	1968	Sinaloa state (September 13)	—	—	
Pauline	1968	Baja California Sur state (October 2)	Sonora state (October 3)	—	
Jennifer	1969	Sinaloa state (September 13)	—	—	
Lily	1971	Jalisco state (August 31)	—	—	
Annette	1972	—	Colima state (June 7)	—	
Dolores	1974	Guerrero state (June 16)	—	—	
Norma	1974	—	Guerrero state (September 10)	—	
Kathleen	1976	—	Baja California Sur state, Baja California state (September 10)	—	
Doreen	1977	Baja California Sur state (August 15)	Baja California Sur state (August 16)	—	
Aletta	1978	—	Guerrero state (May 31)	—	
Olivia	1978	—	Oaxaca state (September 22)	—	
Otis	1981	—	Sinaloa state (October 30)	—	
Newton	1986	Sonora state (September 23)	—	—	
Cosme	1989	Guerrero state (June 22)	—	—	
Lester	1992	Baja California Sur state (August 23)	Sonora state (August 23)	—	
Ismael	1995	Sinaloa state (September 15)	—	—	
Boris	1996	Guerrero state (June 29)	—	—	
Hernan	1996	Jalisco state (October 3)	—	Nayarit state (October 4)	
Isis	1998	Sinaloa state (September 3)	Baja California Sur state (September 2)	—	
Greg	1999	—	Baja California Sur state (September 7)	—	
Olaf	2003	—	Colima state (October 7)	—	
Adrian	2005	—	—	Honduras (May 20)	
Henriette	2007	Baja California Sur state (September 4)	Sonora state (September 6)	—	
Barbara	2013	Chiapas state (May 29)	—	—	
Manuel	2013	Sinaloa state (September 19)	Michoacán state (September 15)	—	
Carlos	2015	—	Jalisco state (June 17)	—	
Newton	2016	Baja California Sur state (September 6)	Sonora state (September 7)	—	
Max	2017	Guerrero state (September 14)	—	—	
Lorena	2019	Jalisco state (September 19), Baja California Sur state (September 21)	—	—	
Nora	2021	Jalisco state (August 27)			
Pamela	2021	Sinaloa state (October 13)	—	—	

== See also ==
- List of Pacific hurricanes
- List of Pacific hurricane seasons
- List of Category 1 Atlantic hurricanes
- List of Category 1 Australian region tropical cyclones
- List of Category 1 South Pacific tropical cyclones
