= Hurricane Lorena (2025) =

Category 1 Pacific hurricane in 2025

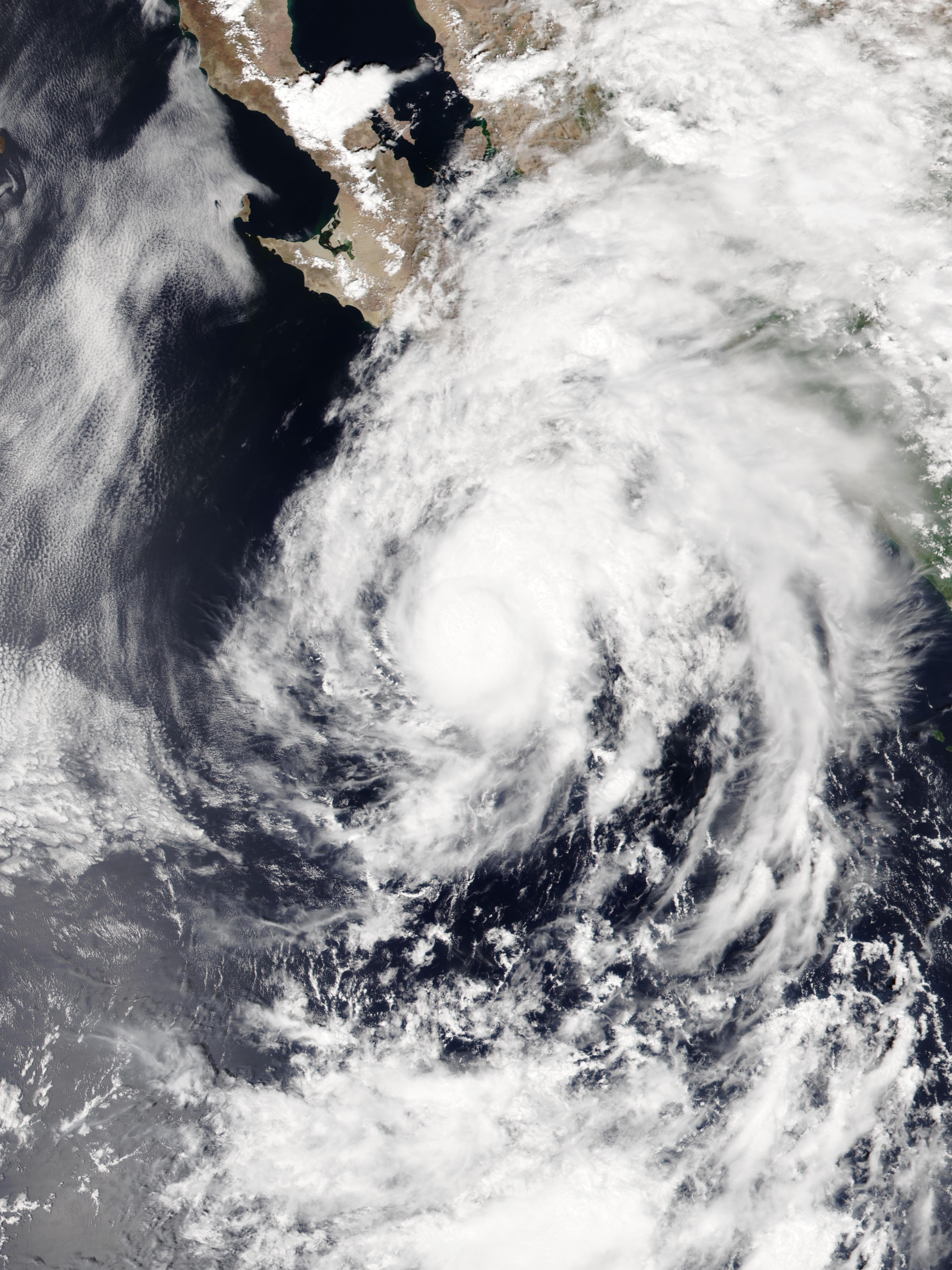
- Hurricane Lorena near peak intensity on September 3

Meteorological history
- Formed: September 2, 2025
- Remnant low: September 5, 2025
- Dissipated: September 7, 2025

Category 1 hurricane
- 1-minute sustained (SSHWS/NWS)
- Highest winds: 85 mph (140 km/h)
- Lowest pressure: 981 mbar (hPa); 28.97 inHg

Overall effects
- Fatalities: None
- Damage: >$1 million (2025 USD)
- Areas affected: Northwestern Mexico, Baja California Sur
- IBTrACS
- Part of the 2025 Pacific hurricane season

Hurricane Lorena was a moderately strong tropical cyclone that affected parts of northwestern Mexico in early September 2025. The fourteenth named storm and eighth hurricane of the 2025 Pacific hurricane season, Lorena originated on August 18 from a tropical wave that moved off the coast of Africa. The wave moved quickly across the eastern Atlantic Ocean and crossed into the eastern Pacific Ocean on developed into a tropical storm on September 2. As it moved northwestward, it began to steadily intensify. By September 3, Lorena strengthened into a hurricane and continued to intensify, attaining its peak as a Category 1 hurricane with maximum sustained winds of 85 mph (140 km/h) and minimum pressure of 981 mbar (28.97 inHg). Shortly after, Lorena quickly weakened and degenerated to a remnant low on September 5. The system then dissipated by September 7.

In preparations for Lorena, the government of Mexico issued tropical storm watches and warnings for coastal areas of Baja California Sur. As the storm paralleled the Baja California peninsula, it brought heavy that caused flash flooding and mudslides that inundated at least eight homes in Baja California Sur. However, no fatalities were attributed to the flooding in Mexico. Additionally, remnant moisture from Lorena combined with a cold front to produce severe thunderstorms across portions of the Southwestern United States. Damage was estimated to be over US$1 million.

== Meteorological history ==
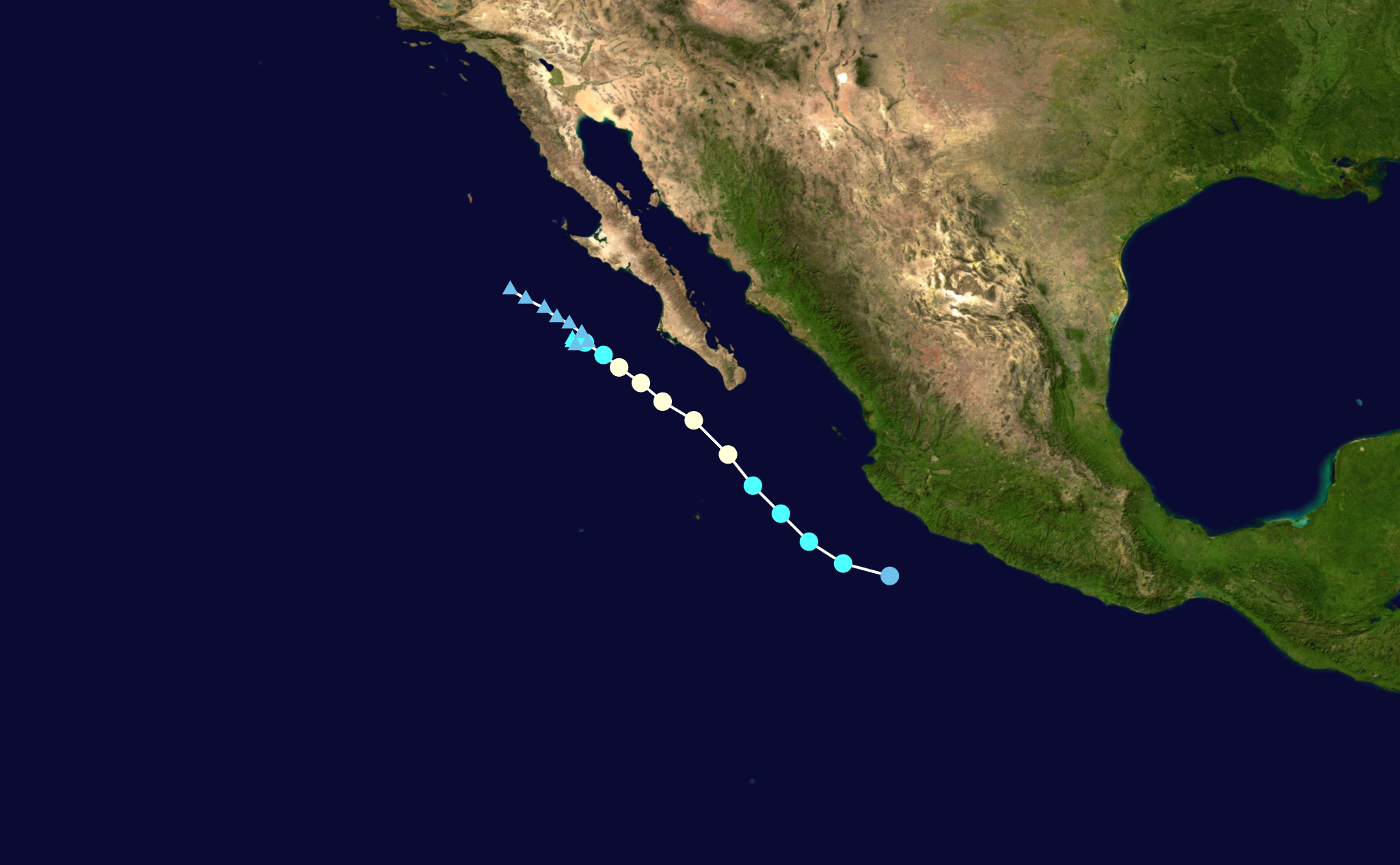
Map plotting the storm's track and intensity, according to the Saffir–Simpson scale Map key Saffir–Simpson scale Tropical depression (≤38 mph, ≤62 km/h) Tropical storm (39–73 mph, 63–118 km/h) Category 1 (74–95 mph, 119–153 km/h) Category 2 (96–110 mph, 154–177 km/h) Category 3 (111–129 mph, 178–208 km/h) Category 4 (130–156 mph, 209–251 km/h) Category 5 (≥157 mph, ≥252 km/h) Unknown Storm type Tropical cyclone Subtropical cyclone Extratropical cyclone, remnant low, tropical disturbance, or monsoon depression

On August 18, 2025, a tropical wave emerged off the western coast of Africa and traversed the northern Atlantic Ocean. The wave then crossed Central America on August 24, and emerged south of Guatemala on August 28. Upon entering eastern Pacific Ocean, thunderstorms within the wave began to organize over the next few days as it moved west-northwest. At 00:00 UTC on September 2, thunderstorm activity in the wave became organized enough for the National Hurricane Center (NHC) of the United States to designate the system as a tropical depression. At 03:00 UTC the same day, the depression then strengthened to a tropical storm and was named Lorena, while located 100 mi (155 km) southwest of Cabo San Lucas, Mexico.

Over the next few days, Lorena began to move northwestward along the southwestern periphery of a mid-level ridge, moving into an environment with light vertical wind shear and very warm sea surface temperatures of 85 °F (30 °C). Lorena began a phase of steady-to-rapid intensification. Lorena continued to organize, indicated by an increase in banding features and cloud tops below −110 °F (−80 °C) within the core. By 06:00 UTC on September 3, Lorena became a Category 1 hurricane. Lorena began to develop a well-defined eye-like feature and by 00:00 UTC on September 4, the hurricane reached peak maximum sustained winds of 85 mph (140 km/h) and a minimum central pressure of 981 mbar (28.97 inHg). Lorena then moved into a less favorable environment for intensification with cooler sea surface temperatures below 80 °F (26 °C) and stronger southwesterly vertical wind shear. Lorena began to rapidly weaken as a result. Microwave imagery showed the eye of Lorena had become exposed, with convection within Lorena being sheared to the northeast of its core. All convection within the storm collapsed by 18:00 UTC on September 4 and Lorena degenerated into a remnant low at 00:00 UTC on September 5. The remnant low then stalled a few hundred miles off the west coast of the Baja California peninsula for a day and then moved slowly northwestward. The low opened up into a trough and dissipated by 12:00 UTC on September 7.

== Preparations and impact ==
=== Mexico ===
Remnants of Lorena impact Northwestern Mexico

On September 3, the government of Mexico issued tropical storm warnings and watches for coastal areas of Baja California Sur. Over 8,000 emergency personnel were deployed across Baja California Sur, Sinaloa, and Nayarit. Ports across La Paz and Los Cabos were closed to small boat traffic. Beaches in Los Cabos were closed, with authorities urging residents and tourists to avoid venturing into the sea. A yellow emergency alert, signifying a moderate level of danger, was issued for Baja California Sur. Classes for all grades in 72 municipalities in Sonora were cancelled in anticipation of Lorena. 144 temporary shelters in Sinaloa were opened for Lorena.

As Hurricane Lorena stalled offshore the Baja California peninsula, its primary effect was heavy rainfall that triggered flash flooding and mudslides. In Santa Anita, Baja California Sur, a peak storm rainfall total of 312 mm (12.3 in) was recorded. Yeneka, Baja California Sur recorded a rainfall total of 265 mm (10.4 in). A maximum wind gust from Lorena was measured at 60 mph (100 km/h) in Cabo San Lucas, Baja California Sur. Damage in Baja California Sur was localized to the Los Cabos, La Paz, Mulegé, Loreto, and Comondú municipalities. Across Los Cabos, floodwaters submerged roadways with mud and debris. Four landslides and three fallen trees were documented. A single power pole was damaged, causing minor disruptions to electrical service. Boats were damaged at the Cabo San Lucas Marina. At least eight homes were inundated, with floodwaters sweeping an additional three homes off their foundations. Over 1,200 residents were forced to evacuate their flooded homes. Additionally, flooded roadways stranded approximately 50 vehicles in Los Cabos. In La Paz, five people were rescued after a landslide on the Los Barriles Highway trapped vehicles.

Persistent rains in Sonora resulted in several streams overflowing their banks. In Hermosillo, 70 homes were damaged in La Caridad. Strong gusts of wind caused the wall of a residential building to collapse on ten vehicles. More than 45 neighborhoods citywide experienced disruption to the supply of drinking water after pumping systems experienced electrical failures. Flood-related rescues were reported in more than 20 neighborhoods citywide. South of Navojoa, rising floodwaters forced the closure of the Tetaboca Bridge to vehicular traffic. Heavy rainfall from the remnants of Lorena triggered flash flooding across Sinaloa. Across the municipalities of Guasave and Ahome, at least 200 residents were evacuated from flooded areas. 35 homes in Guasave suffered damage from floodwaters. Public transportation lines in Los Mochis were suspended as a result of flooded roads. Four fallen utility poles were reported in Higuera de Zaragoza, causing electrical disruption in communities throughout the city. Following the storm, Governor of Sinaloa Rubén Rocha Moya approved the distribution of 490 checks each worth 6,000 Mexican pesos in financial aid to families affected by Lorena.

Media reports indicated that Lorena caused drowning deaths in Nayarit and Sinaloa. However, the NHC later determined these deaths were caused by severe weather unrelated to Lorena.

=== United States ===
Remnant moisture from Hurricane Lorena combined with a cold front and a trough to produce severe thunderstorms across the Southwestern United States. Across the Dallas–Fort Worth metroplex in North Texas, strong winds damaged structures while heavy rainfall caused flooding on roadways. A maximum wind gust of 75 mph (125 km/h) was reported in Denton County. Lightning strikes ignited fires, causing structural damage to four homes and destroying an additional home. In Fannin, a total of 8,000 power outages were reported as a result of downed trees and power lines. Strong winds damaged a hangar and several small planes. In Frisco, strong winds blew off part of the roof of a church. In Grayson County, three goats were killed when strong winds caused a barn to collapse. In Yuma County, Arizona, a wind gust of 65 mph (105 km/h) caused a tree to fall on two vehicles and another tree downed by strong gusts of winds damaged the roof of a home. Damage in the United States was estimated to be over US$1 million.

== See also ==
- List of Category 1 Pacific hurricanes
- Other storms with the same name
- Timeline of the 2025 Pacific hurricane season
- Tropical cyclones in 2025
- Weather of 2025
- List of Baja California Peninsula hurricanes
