= Hurricane Lorena (2019) =

Category 1 Pacific hurricane in 2019

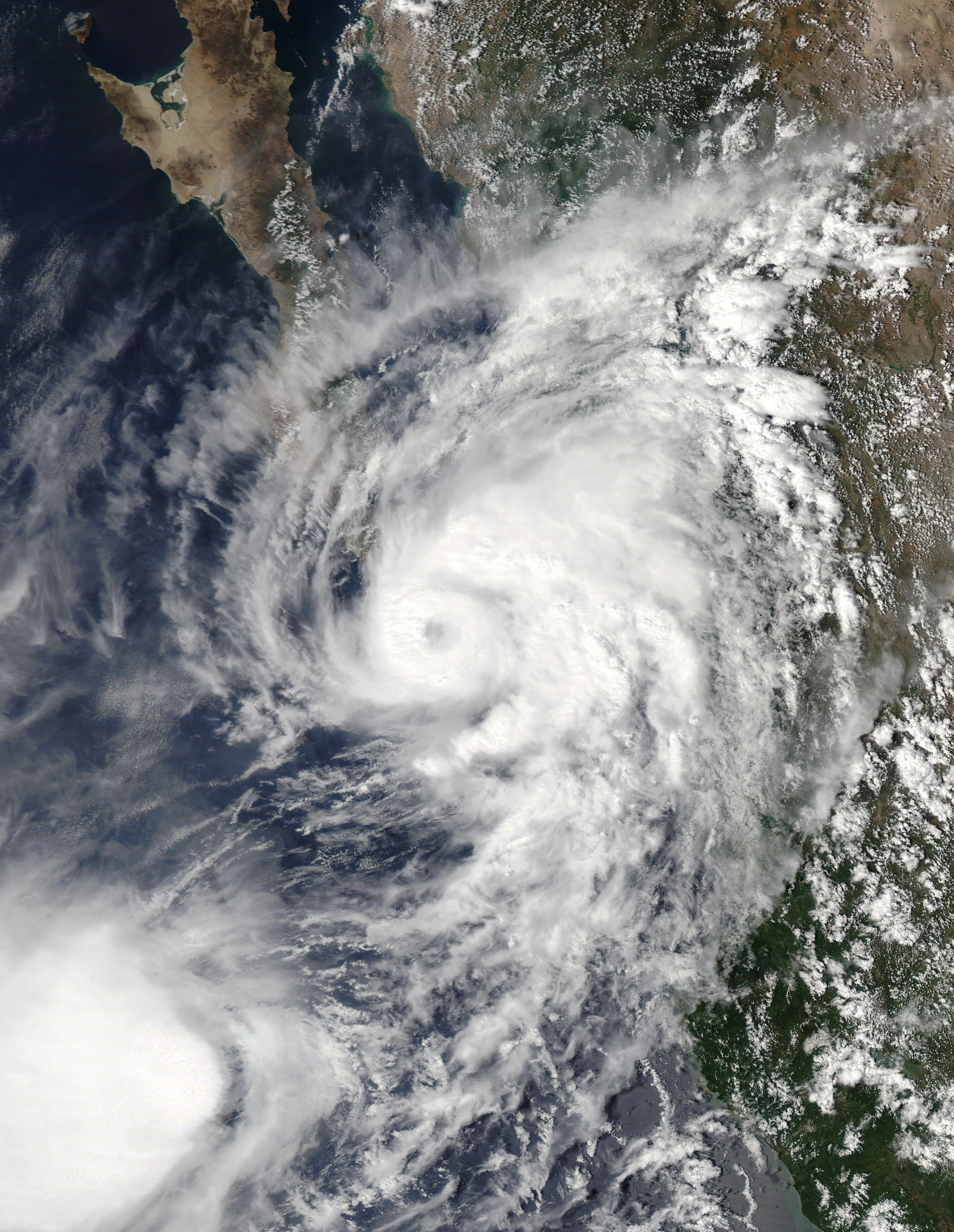
- Hurricane Lorena skirting Baja California Sur on September 20, with Tropical Storm Mario visible to the southwest

Meteorological history
- Formed: September 17, 2019
- Remnant low: September 22, 2019
- Dissipated: September 24, 2019

Category 1 hurricane
- 1-minute sustained (SSHWS/NWS)
- Highest winds: 85 mph (140 km/h)
- Lowest pressure: 985 mbar (hPa); 29.09 inHg

Overall effects
- Fatalities: 1 total
- Damage: $50 million (2019 USD)
- Areas affected: Guerrero, Michoacán, Jalisco, Colima, Sonora, Baja California Peninsula, Arizona
- IBTrACS /
- Part of the 2019 Pacific hurricane season

Hurricane Lorena was a moderate Pacific hurricane in September 2019 that brought heavy rainfall, flooding, and mudslides to Southwestern Mexico and the Baja California Peninsula and also brought severe weather to the U.S. state of Arizona. Lorena was the thirteenth named storm and seventh and final hurricane of the 2019 Pacific hurricane season. A tropical wave, originally from the North Atlantic, entered the East Pacific basin on September 16. With increasing thunderstorm development, Lorena formed as a tropical storm on September 17 alongside Tropical Storm Mario. Lorena made its passage northwestward and quickly gained strength before it made landfall as a Category 1 hurricane in Jalisco on September 19. Due to interaction with the mountainous terrain, Lorena weakened back to a tropical storm. After moving into the warm ocean temperatures of the Gulf of California, however, Lorena re-strengthened into a hurricane, and reached its peak intensity with 1-minute sustained winds of 85 mph (137 km/h) and a minimum barometric pressure of 985 millibars (29.1 inHg) Lorena made a second landfall in the Mexican state of Baja California Sur, and quickly weakened thereafter. Lorena weakened to a tropical storm over the Gulf of California, and became a remnant low on September 22, shortly after making landfall in Sonora as a tropical depression. The remnant low moved inland over Mexico, and eventually dissipated inland over Arizona on September 24.

In preparation for the hurricane, hurricane warnings and watches were issued for most of the southwestern coast of Mexico on September 19 whilst hundreds of people were evacuated. Torrential rainfall brought in the states of Colima and Jalisco damaged thousands of hectares worth of crops and damaged at least 201 homes on the coastline. Damage in the agricultural sector between both states was substantial, causing the price of banana crops to rise in the state of Colima. Floods from rivers swelling in Colima blocked roads while landslides occurred across both states. On the Baja California Peninsula, dangerous surf caused a man to die attempting to save his child after being pulled out to sea. In addition, schools were entirely shut down for 506,000 students. 787 people were evacuated from the Eastern coastline of the peninsula to 17 temporary sheltering facilities, while numerous flights in and out of Baja California Sur were cancelled. After weakening in the Gulf of California and leaving 2 fishermen missing, Lorena moved inland into mainland Mexico and eventually the United States. Lorena's remnant low spawned 3 tornadoes in Arizona and caused very high rainfall totals for the region with over half a foot in some areas. Damage from Lorena totaled $50 million (2019 USD) or greater, including $40 million from Mexico.

== Meteorological history ==
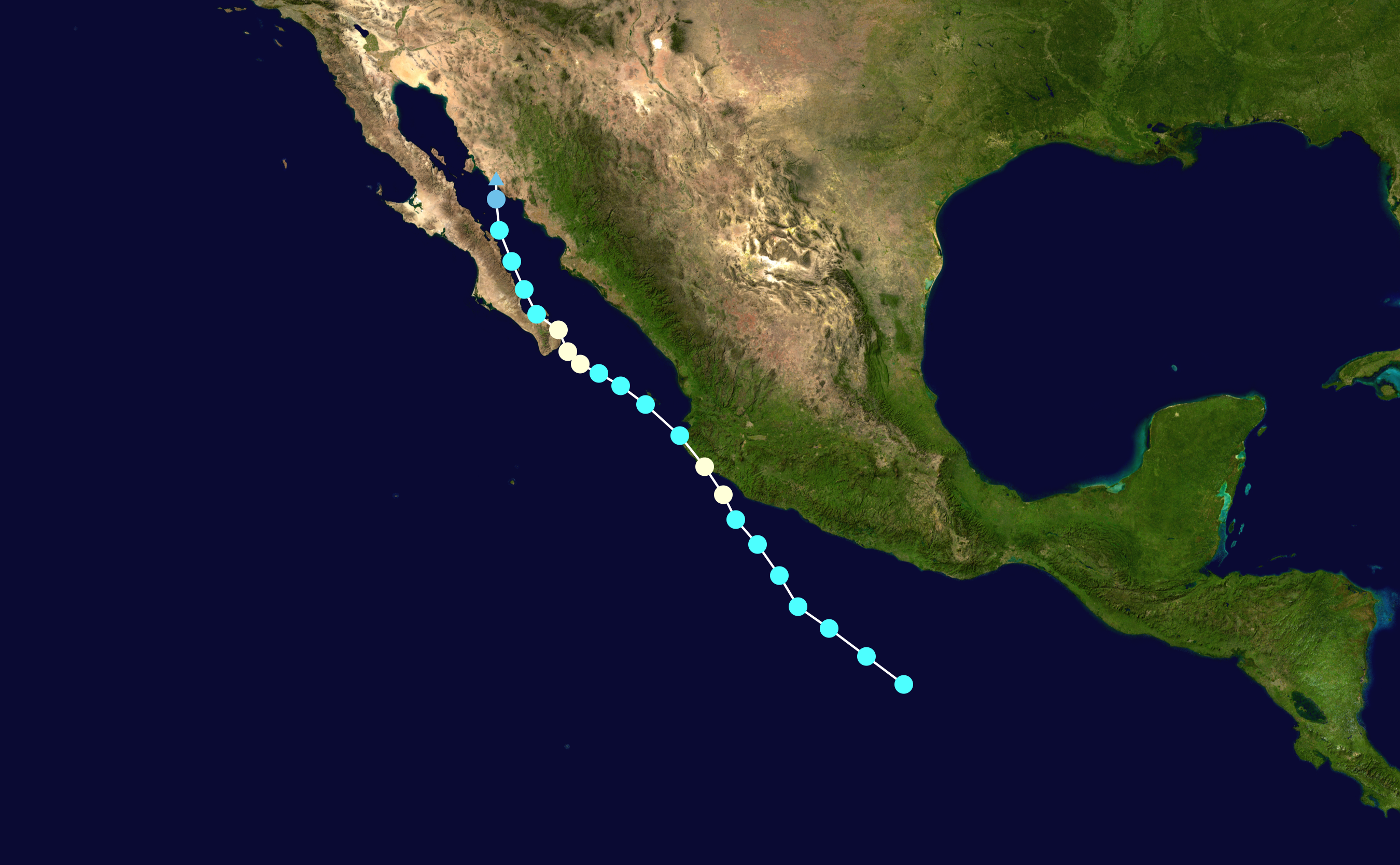
Map plotting the storm's track and intensity, according to the Saffir–Simpson scale Map key Saffir–Simpson scale Tropical depression (≤38 mph, ≤62 km/h) Tropical storm (39–73 mph, 63–118 km/h) Category 1 (74–95 mph, 119–153 km/h) Category 2 (96–110 mph, 154–177 km/h) Category 3 (111–129 mph, 178–208 km/h) Category 4 (130–156 mph, 209–251 km/h) Category 5 (≥157 mph, ≥252 km/h) Unknown Storm type Tropical cyclone Subtropical cyclone Extratropical cyclone, remnant low, tropical disturbance, or monsoon depression

The origins of Lorena can first be traced back to a tropical wave which emerged off the coast of Western Africa on September 4, 2019. At the time, the wave had two distinctive areas of cyclonic rotation, but both eventually merged just east of the Lesser Antilles. At 15:00 UTC on September 11, the National Hurricane Center (NHC) noted the possibility of a low-pressure region forming within the wave off of the Central American coast. Despite not having a well-defined center, the disturbance was already producing tropical-storm-force winds by late September 16, as it emerged into the Eastern Pacific basin. By 06:00 UTC on September 17, the disturbance had improved in overall organization, with the formation of an identifiable low-level center and bursts of convective cloud tops, and was named Tropical Storm Lorena by the NHC, becoming the thirteenth named storm of the season. Lorena began quickly strengthening, gradually moving northwestward towards the coast of Mexico. At 00:00 UTC on September 19, Lorena reached its initial peak intensity as a Category 1 hurricane, the seventh hurricane of the annual season, with 1-minute sustained winds of 80 mph (130 km/h), only miles away from the coast of Jalisco. After slightly weakening, Lorena made its first landfall in Chamela-Cuixmala only 6 hours afterwards.

Interaction with land caused Lorena to weaken below hurricane status by 15:00 UTC on September 19. Lorena drifted close to the coastline of Manzillo, Colima as a tropical storm for several hours. Because the storm emerged over the typically warm sea-surface temperatures of the Gulf of California, Lorena regained hurricane status and peaked with 1-minute sustained winds of 85 mph (137 km/h) and a pressure of 985 mbar (29.1 inHg) by 18:00 UTC on September 20. At the time, an eye had begun to emerge 35 miles (56 km) east of Cabo San Lucas. Lorena slowed to a crawl paralleling the coast of the Baja California Peninsula, but eventually made landfall near La Ventana at 03:00 UTC on 21 September, whilse slightly weakening below its peak strength. By midday on September 21, Lorena's structure began to quickly deteriorate, as its convection weakened. Due to increasing wind shear and weakening caused by its proximity to the mountainous terrain of Baja California, Lorena degenerated into a tropical depression by mid-morning on September 22 in the northern Gulf of California, later becoming a remnant low by that evening just following its final landfall in Sonora. The remnant low drifted northward and entirely dissipated inland over the U.S. state of Arizona on September 24.

== Preparations and impact ==
=== Mexico ===
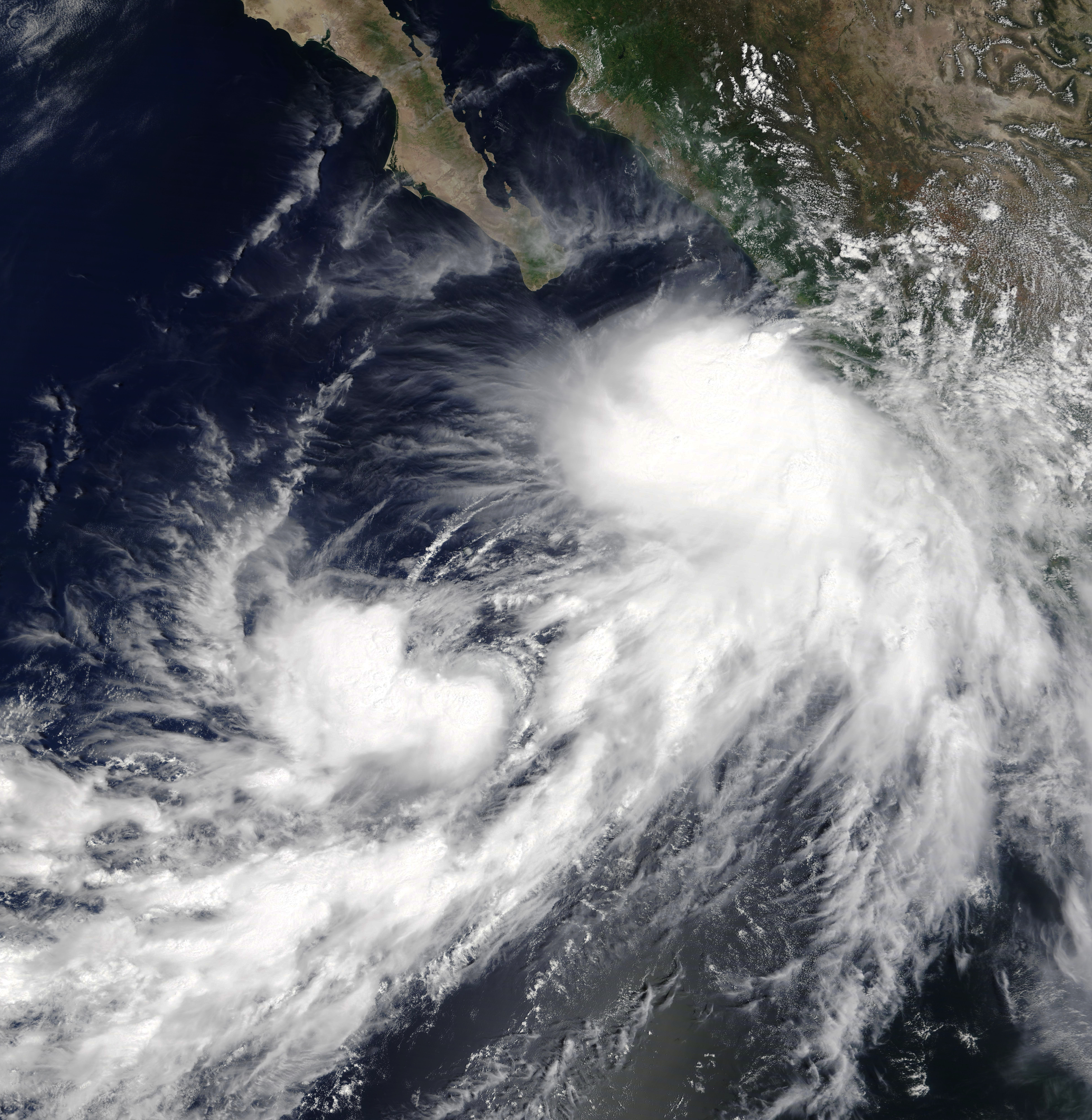
Tropical Storm Mario (left) and Lorena (right) situated off the Mexican coast on September 19

==== Jalisco ====
Tropical storm watches were issued from Zihuatanejo in Guerrero to Cabo Corrientes in Jalisco on September 17 by the Mexican government, and were later upgraded to tropical storm warnings. Hurricane warnings were also issued for Manzanillo, Colima to Cabo Corrientes on September 19. During this time, Lorena was moving very close to the shorelines of the states of Colima and Jalisco, and at its first peak in strength. Red alerts, the highest level of danger alert, were issued statewide in Jalisco, and at least 240 people there were evacuated prior to the storm. Schools were shut down across most of the state due to the impending hurricane. Flooded streets, washed-out roads, landslides in 10 municipalities, and dozens of downed trees were reported. Power was knocked out in some areas. Floods up to 3 ft (0.91 m) high affected the town of Chamela in Jalisco while Mexican Federal Highway 200 was blocked by collapsed trees and floods. 3,700 hectares of basic crops such as maize, wheat, beans and other crops such as bananas, papayas, or mangoes were destroyed by Lorena in Jalisco and recovery from this loss was anticipated to take months. Communications were briefly cut off, while 201 homes on the coastline were destroyed. Road infrastructural damage in Jalisco was calculated at 17.7 million pesos (US$910,000). Total damage statewide was calculated at 745 million pesos (US$38.3 million).

==== Colima ====
Governor of Colima, José Ignacio Peralta, stated on September 20 that nearly 8 inches of rain fell over the course of 24 hours during Lorena, and more than 7,400 acres of crops such as bananas and papayas were damaged statewide. Further evaluation 3 days later showed seven months worth or 1,600 hectares of bananas, papayas, lemons, and cereal crops were destroyed by Lorena in Colima. Prices of bananas thus rose by over 3 pesos in the state. La Boquita Beach was one of the most hard-hit areas of Manzanillo, with roofs ripped from homes and debris from the wind-damaged structures scattered across the area. The cities Tecomán, Manzanillo, Villa de Álvarez, and Coquimatlán all had lost power due to Lorena according to the State Civil Protection Unit. Mexico's National Water Commission reported that in one area 283 mm (11.1 in) of rain fell in Colima within a 24-hour period. Peralta later stated that three rescues of people were required but there was no apparent loss of life. Part of the Bridge of Tepalcates, a tourist destination in Manzanillo, collapsed during the hurricane, causing traffic to be shifted to a new road. An overflow of the Armería River entirely cut off parts of Coquimatlán from traffic, while several landslides in Minatitlán blocked a road. The Cuixmala River also broke its banks in the municipality of La Huerta and flooded agricultural land. Total damage statewide was calculated at 33.2 million pesos (US$1.7 million).

==== Baja California Peninsula ====
Once Lorena moved along the southwestern coast of Mexico, the government of Mexico issued a hurricane watch for the southern coast of Baja California as the storm was expected to make landfall there as a Category 1 hurricane. Red (high-danger) warnings were issued for much of southern Baja California Sur. Once Lorena moved away from the coast and started moving closer to Baja California Sur, residents started to barricade doors and windows and pull their boats from the ocean in preparation for landfall. Government officials closed down schools for 506,000 students prior to the hurricane. Areas off the coast were initially expected to receive 40% of the state's annual rainfall within days. As Lorena started to move parallel to the peninsula's coast, authorities in Los Cabos said that 787 people had taken refuge in 18 shelters; many tourists did not take precaution, however, and still traveled to Los Cabos. Many flights in and out of Los Cabos International Airport were canceled on September 20. The National Civil Protection Coordination declared a state of emergency in La Paz and Los Cabos, Baja California Sur on September 22. The track of the hurricane was described as highly erratic and unpredictable. Up to 125 mm (4.9 in) of rain fell near Los Cabos, although flooding was minimal at most due to the hurricane's small size at the time. However, Lorena did produce life-threatening swells on much of the Baja California Peninsula in combination with Tropical Storm Mario. In Los Cabos, a father and son were swept out to sea by a large wave. The father drowned while trying to save his son, who survived.

==== Other states ====
On September 18, Lorena briefly affected the states of Guerrero and Michoacán. There were reports of heavy rainfall and downed trees.

Residents of Sonora prepared for torrential rainfall as Lorena approached as a tropical depression on September 21. Orange and yellow alerts were issued for much of the coast of Sonora as Lorena rapidly approached. Two fishermen from Sonora in the Gulf of California were reported missing. Isolated heavy rainfall was reported in Sonora with a maximum rainfall total of 112 mm (4.4 in) falling in 24 hours, but there was no reported damage.

=== United States ===
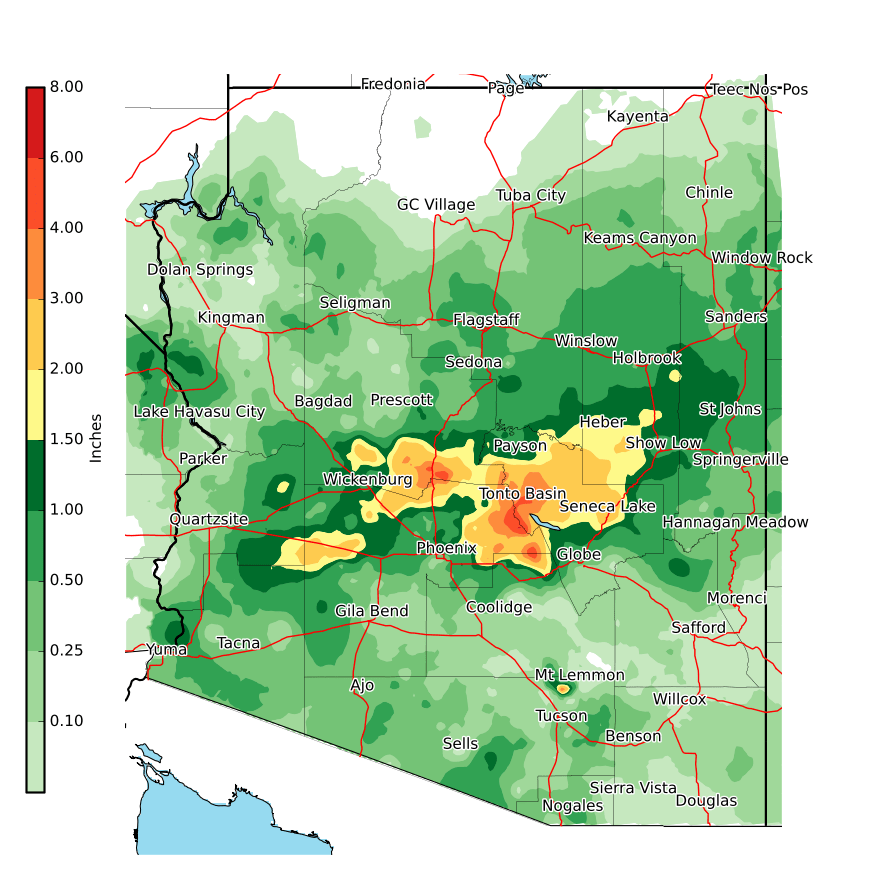
Rainfall totals from Hurricane Lorena's remnants in Arizona between September 22–24.

==== Arizona ====
The remnants of Lorena passed through Arizona on September 22–24, causing widespread severe thunderstorms and resulting flash floods. More than 8,000 customers lost electricity in the Phoenix area while flights at Phoenix Sky Harbor International Airport were delayed by hours, or cancelled. Precipitation peaked at 4 to 6 in (100 to 150 mm) near Phoenix. In preparation for the storm, free sandbags were offered to residents of Scottsdale to prevent flooding of households. Flash flood warnings were issued for much of the Phoenix metropolitan area. On September 23, a supercell thunderstorm produced a brief EF-0 tornado in New River in Maricopa County, the first time in 5 years the NWS Phoenix office had issued a tornado warning. Minor damage was reported in the area. Another EF-0 tornado very briefly touched down near Stanfield and was observed by a trained storm spotter, not causing any known damage. A very rare phenomenon for the state also occurred when an EF-1 tornado formed in Willcox, snapping power lines, injuring 2 people, damaging a barn, and tossing over mobile homes. One resident driving in the affected area reported that over 40 trees had been uprooted.

A school bus with about 120 children on board was stranded in floodwaters, but they were safely rescued. Locals north of downtown Phoenix and in Paradise Valley reported penny- to nickel-sized hail while visibility was down to less than a ¼ mile. Due to low visibility, a nearly submerged car needed to be "fished" out of floodwaters. A dust storm warning was briefly issued near Arizona State Route 85 as visibility became incredibly low. The Chapter of the American Red Cross in Southern Arizona was deployed and brought aid as needed for effected homes and to assess damage, especially for the Willcox tornado.

== See also ==
- Weather of 2019
- Tropical cyclones in 2019
- List of Category 1 Pacific hurricanes
- Other storms of the same name
- List of Baja California Peninsula hurricanes
- List of Arizona hurricanes
- Hurricane Henriette (2007)
- Hurricane Manuel (2013)
- Hurricane Odile (2014)
- Hurricane Newton (2016)
- Tropical Storm Lidia (2017)
- Tropical Storm Narda (2019)
