= 2025 Philippine monsoon floods =

Natural disaster in the Philippines

2025 Philippine floods
- Date: July 15, 2025–July 26, 2025
- Location: Philippines
- Cause: Southwest monsoon, two tropical storms
- Deaths: 30

The 2025 Philippine monsoon floods were a series of floods caused by a southwest monsoon during the month of July. It was significantly enhanced by Tropical Storm Wipha and Tropical Storm Co-May, causing major damage over the northern portion of the Philippines as flooding was produced. Rainfall warnings were hoisted in affected areas in a period of a week; work suspensions were also placed. After numerous increases, the final death toll stood at 30. Massive flooding affected roads in Luzon, especially the North Luzon Expressway. Millions of people were affected, with thousands of homes being damaged. A state of calamity was declared in numerous cities, namely San Miguel, Manila, and Malabon, along with the province of Cavite. Foundations including the GMA Kapuso Foundation, Caritas Philippines, and Angat Buhay initiated charities and donation drives.

== Background ==
The Southwest monsoon, locally called habagat, regularly forms during the summer from May until October; it is a wind system typically characterized by warm and humid winds blowing from the southwest. The start of the southwest monsoon season for 2025 was declared on May 30. Filipino weather bureau PAGASA announced that an already existing southwest monsoon was going to affect the island province of Luzon on July 20.

=== Tropical Storm Wipha ===
A low-pressure area formed inside the Philippine Area of Responsibility on July 15. The next day, PAGASA upgraded the system into a tropical depression and subsequently named it as Crising. At 20:00 PHT (12:00 UTC) on July 18, the system was upgraded into a tropical storm as it was named Wipha by the Japan Meteorological Agency (JMA), passing near the Babuyan Islands. When Wipha passed near Cagayan, it contributed to the flooding caused by the southwest monsoon. Multiple provinces were issued orange rainfall warnings.

=== Tropical Storm Co-May ===
A tropical depression formed in the northern Philippines, attaining the name Emong from PAGASA. PAGASA declared the system a tropical storm the same day. The next day, the storm intensified to a typhoon. It made landfall over Pangasinan the same day. Co-May further exacerbated the southwest monsoon and continued to bring heavy rainfall to the island of Luzon, especially the western sections.

== Preparations ==
The issuance of the first weather advisory of the system from PAGASA was declared on July 15, with Antique and Negros Occidental placed in the orange rainfall alert predicting 100 to 200 millimetres (3.9 to 7.9 inches) of rainfall in those areas. The next day, Palawan and Occidental Mindoro were placed in orange rainfall. No changes were recorded in the following day. The provinces of Pangasinan, Zambales, Bataan, Cavite, and Occidental Mindoro were declared to have orange rainfall in its 5 a.m. advisory on July 20.

On July 21, classes were suspended in multiple provinces including many in Metro Manila, some parts of six provinces in northern Luzon, and all classes in Bataan. The region of Metro Manila and the provinces of Bulacan, Batangas, and Rizal were included in the orange rainfall alert on July 22. The provinces of Bataan and Occidental Mindoro were then issued a red rainfall alert, with rainfall totals above 200 mm (7.9 in) expected. By July 25, only Occidental Mindoro was still subject to a red rainfall alert, with six provinces still remaining in the orange rainfall alerts. A few hours later, Occidental Mindoro remained in the red rainfall alert. All provinces were eventually removed from the orange rainfall alerts, with only six remaining in yellow rainfall. The next day, three more provinces were added to the yellow rainfall alert. The next day, Benguet was placed in the orange rainfall alert. Benguet was eventually removed, and seven provinces remained in the yellow rainfall alert on July 29. The next day, Batanes and Ilocos Norte were left in yellow rainfall.

On July 22, the Department of the Interior and Local Government (DILG) Secretary Jonvic Remulla alerted local politicians of high-risk areas and areas to initiate local evacuation. He also commanded the Philippine National Police and the Bureau of Fire Protection to assist the evacuation efforts. Over 1,000 residents of Parañaque from 889 families sought evacuation centers. Evacuees in the city used 13 evacuation centers. Classes and government work were suspended in 36 provinces on July 23. A lahar advisory for areas around the Mayon volcano was issued due to heavy rains. Numerous flights of Cebu Pacific, Cebgo, and the Philippine Airlines were cancelled while a flight of AirAsia was diverted. Communities along the Marikina River were alerted due to the river's high-water level.

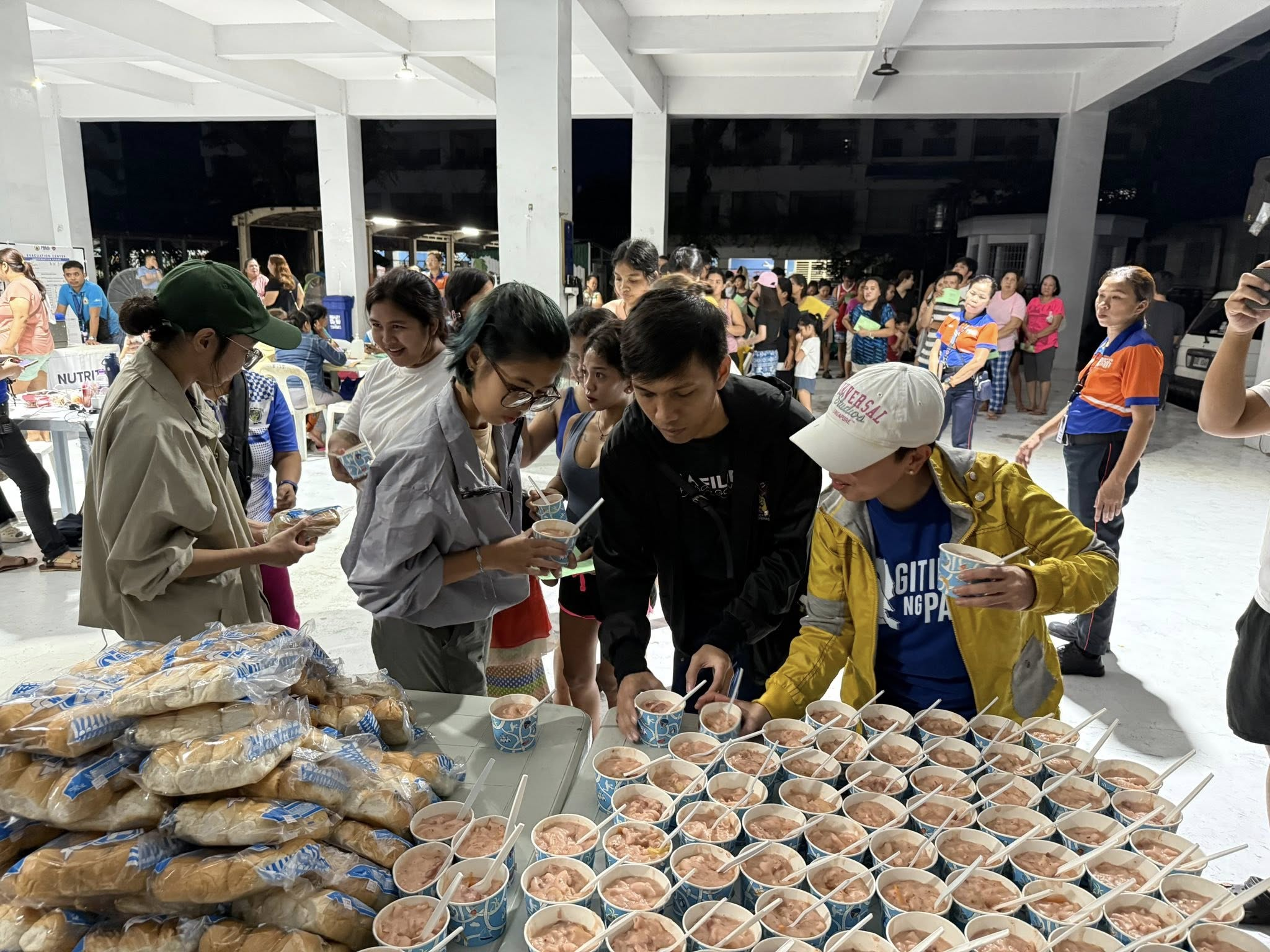
Food supplies distributed by Akbayan supporters and Representative Chel Diokno during the effects of Wipha and the monsoon.

== Impact ==
By July 20, two people were reportedly missing while thousands evacuated from their homes. Two days later, six deaths were reported from the flooding; 1,266,322 individuals were also affected. The final reported toll for the floods was 30 deaths, with 10 injuries and 7 missing. Multiple provinces in the regions of Cagayan Valley, the Cordillera Administrative Region, Central Luzon, Calabarzon, Mimaropa, the Bicol Region, and Western Visayas were required to keep basic needs, like health and response duties, operational during the floods. An overflowing river stranded motorists in Las Piñas. Overflowing rivers blocked roads in Las Piñas. On the North Luzon Expressway, drivers were stranded for hours as pumping stations couldn't control the floods. Overflowing rivers caused floods in multiple parts of Pangasinan. In Calasiao, residents used makeshift rafts to travel across the municipality. More than 1,700 houses in Mangaldan and an elementary school were affected by flooding. Almost all of the 23 barangays in Kawit were flooded, with a river in one barangay overflowing.

== Response and legacy ==
A special session led by government officials from Quezon City and Manila declared a state of calamity for the two governments on July 22. The same day, the local government of Malabon declared a state of calamity because of destruction of infrastructure and evacuation. The same day, the provincial government of Cavite declared a state of calamity. Multiple organizations organized relief operations for the floods. The GMA Kapuso Foundation started accepting donations. The Angat Buhay organization is currently organizing relief operations in Quezon City, Caloocan, Valenzuela, Metro Manila, Pasig, Marikina, and Taytay, Rizal. The Caritas Manila organization launched a donation drive for the effects of the flooding. Cultural organization SIKAD ran monetary donations. The floods, according to Broadsheet, exposed corruption in the Philippines. The website stated that flood control projects did not work due to possible corruption because of the lack of a centralized plan and also opined that the floods should be a "wake-up-call" for the administration of President Bongbong Marcos to fix the broken flood control projects.

== See also ==
- 2012 Luzon southwest monsoon floods
- 2016 Philippine southwest monsoon floods
- Storms that brought major flooding in Manila:
  - Typhoon Ketsana (Ondoy, 2009)
  - Tropical Storm Fung-wong (Mario, 2014)
  - Typhoon Vamco (Ulysses, 2020)
  - Typhoon Gaemi (Carina, 2024)
- 2025 Pacific typhoon season
- Flood control projects controversy in the Philippines
