= 2016 Philippine southwest monsoon floods =

Natural disaster in Metro Manila and nearby regions

- Date: August 8-22, 2016
- Location: Philippines (mainly Luzon and Western Visayas)
- Deaths: 19
- Injuries: 12
- Missing: 7

In August 2016, the southwest monsoon (Filipino: Habagat) brought heavy rainfall and flooding to Metro Manila and nearby regions.

== Background ==
A low pressure area that barely entered the Philippine area of responsibility (PAR), and which at one point was north of Batanes and exited the country by August 14, as well as a tropical depression located in the Pacific Ocean outside the PAR, enhanced the southwest monsoon.

== Impact ==
On August 14, 2016, the National Disaster Risk Reduction and Management Council reported that about 70,000 people, or 15,665 families, were affected by the enhanced monsoon rains in the regions of Central Luzon (Region 3), Calabarzon (Region 4-A), Mimaropa (Region 4-B), Western Visayas (Region 6), the Negros Island Region, the Autonomous Region in Muslim Mindanao, and the National Capital Region (NCR). Occasional rains were also experienced in the rest of Luzon and the Visayas. The most affected provinces were reportedly Bataan, Bulacan, and Zambales.

The enhanced monsoon caused a tornado to spawn in Manila's port area, causing damages.

At least five were reported to have died from the floods.

== Response ==
The Department of Social Welfare and Development opened at least 79 evacuation centers across the island of Luzon. In Marikina, Metro Manila, where the Marikina River overflowed due to enhanced monsoon rains, 21 evacuation centers were set up where at least 9,152 people were housed.

Maynilad, which serves significant portions of Metro Manila, reduced its water production due to raw water sedimentation at the La Mesa watershed caused by the monsoon rains. The rains also caused soil erosion in the Angat watershed.

== See also ==
- 2016 Pacific typhoon season
- 2012 Luzon southwest monsoon floods - spawned by Typhoon Haikui and Typhoon Gener (Saola)
- 2025 Philippine monsoon floods - spawned by Tropical Storm Wipha (Crising) and Tropical Storm Co-May (Emong)
