= List of storms named Ondoy =

The name Ondoy has been used for three tropical cyclones in the Philippine Area of Responsibility by PAGASA in the Western Pacific Ocean.

- Tropical Storm Ondoy (2001) (28W) – a weak storm that completed a loop to the east of Samar Island before moving further out to sea.
- Tropical Storm Tembin (2005) (T0522, 23W, Ondoy) – made landfall in the northern Philippines.
- Typhoon Ketsana (2009) (T0916, 17W, Ondoy) – made landfall in the Philippines and causing massive flooding in Metro Manila and other nearby provinces.

The name Ondoy was retired following the 2009 Pacific typhoon season and was replaced with Odette.
