= 2012 Luzon southwest monsoon floods =

Monsoon floods in the Philippines in 2012

The 2012 Luzon southwest monsoon floods (informally known in Tagalog as Hagupít ng Habagat, "wrath of the monsoon" and Bagsík ng Habagat, "fierceness of the monsoon", from habagat, the Filipino term for the southwest monsoon), was an eight-day period of torrential rain and thunderstorms that affected Luzon in the Philippines from August 1 to August 8, 2012. Its effects centered on Metro Manila, the surrounding provinces of the Calabarzon region (Quezon, Cavite, Laguna and Rizal) and the provinces of Central Luzon (Bulacan, Pampanga and Bataan). Not a typhoon in its own right, the storm was a strong movement of the southwest monsoon (Tagalog: Habagat) caused by the pull of Typhoon Saola (Gener) from August 1–3, which further exacerbated by Typhoon Haikui. It caused typhoon-like damage: the worst caused by rain since September 2009, when Typhoon Ketsana (Ondoy) struck Metro Manila. The heavy rain caused Marikina River to swell, inundating areas also affected by Ketsana, triggering a landslide in the Commonwealth area, and collapsing the northbound Marcos Highway.

Its damage was nearly as severe as Ketsana's, although the storm did not reach typhoon intensity when rains reached its peak on August 7. The floods and rain left 95 people dead, 8,428 homes destroyed and 6,706 damaged. Nationwide losses totaled at least ₱604.63 million (US$14.31 million).

== Typhoon Gener ==
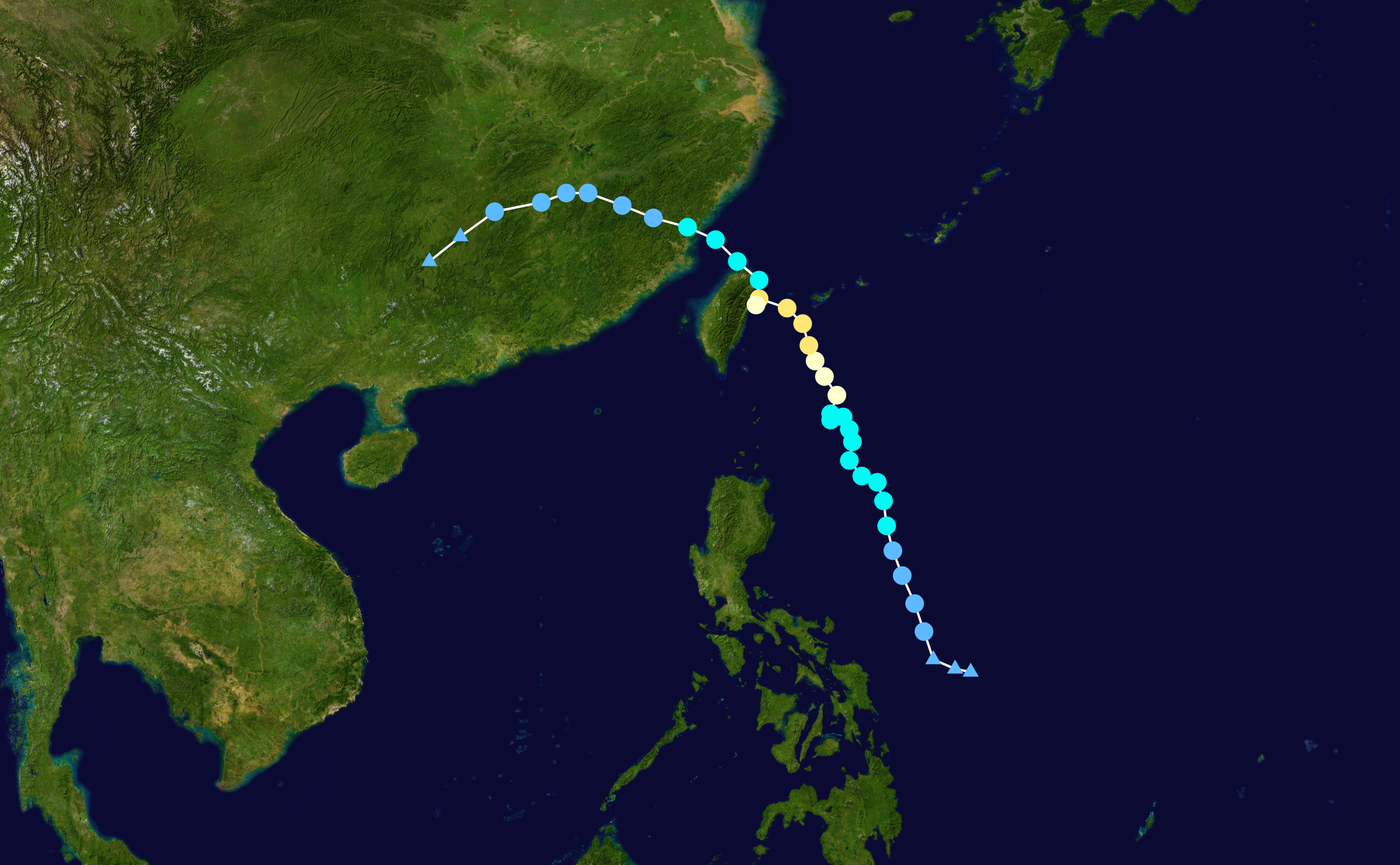
Map plotting the storm's track and intensity, according to the Saffir–Simpson scale Map key Saffir–Simpson scale Tropical depression (≤38 mph, ≤62 km/h) Tropical storm (39–73 mph, 63–118 km/h) Category 1 (74–95 mph, 119–153 km/h) Category 2 (96–110 mph, 154–177 km/h) Category 3 (111–129 mph, 178–208 km/h) Category 4 (130–156 mph, 209–251 km/h) Category 5 (≥157 mph, ≥252 km/h) Unknown Storm type Tropical cyclone Subtropical cyclone Extratropical cyclone, remnant low, tropical disturbance, or monsoon depression

On July 26, the Japan Meteorological Agency (JMA) reported that a tropical depression had developed within an area of strong vertical wind shear in the monsoon trough about 1,000 kilometres (620 mi) southeast of Manila. Although the shear temporarily relaxed, it increased the following day and the Joint Typhoon Warning Center (JTWC) issued a Tropical Cyclone Formation Alert for the system.

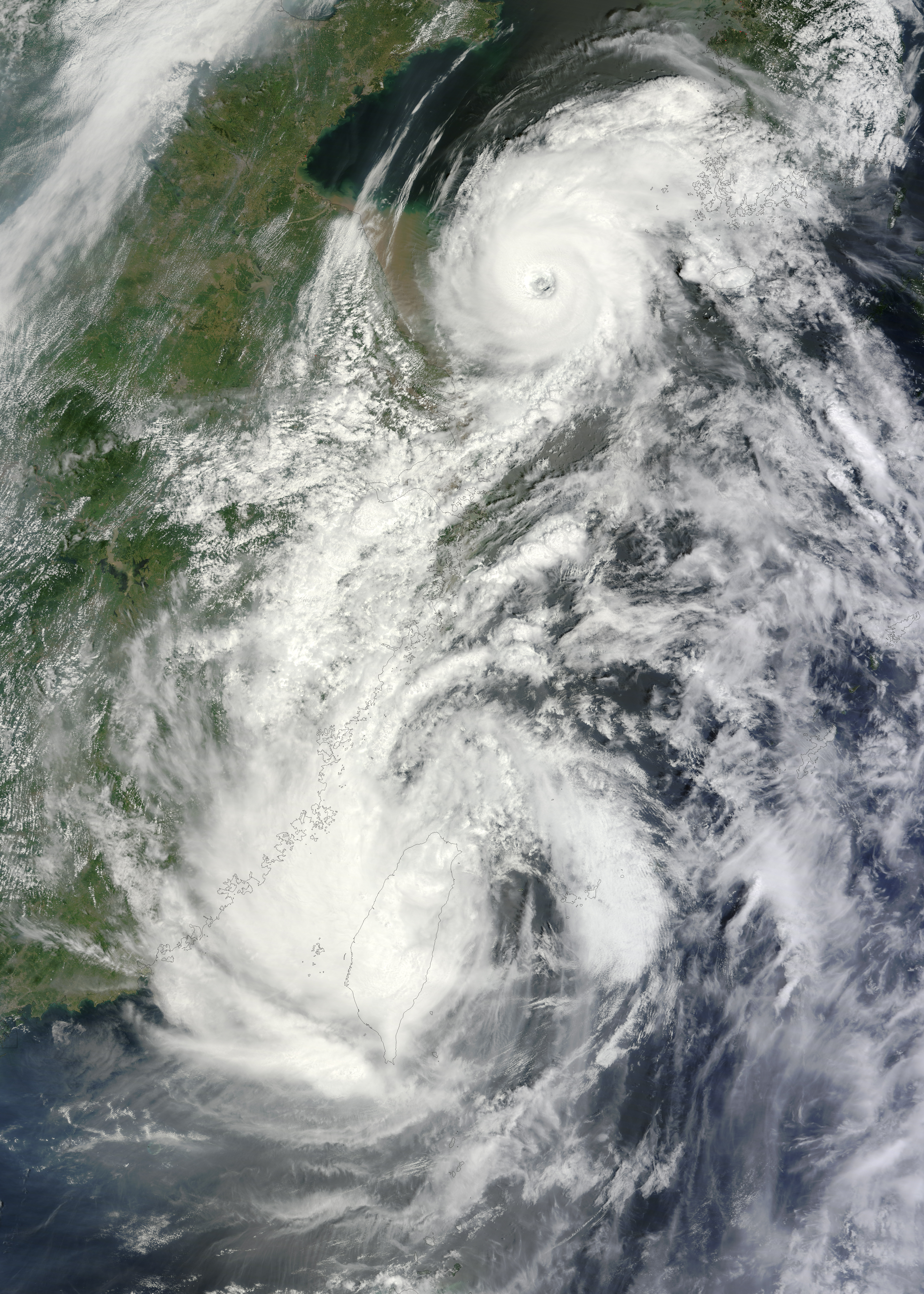
Typhoon Saola (Gener) over Taiwan, with nearby storm Damrey

The Philippine Atmospheric, Geophysical and Astronomical Services Administration (PAGASA) upgraded the system to a tropical depression (naming it "Gener"); the JTWC upgraded "Saola" to a tropical storm, and early on July 29 the JMA upgraded it to a severe tropical storm. On July 30 the JTWC upgraded Gener to a Category 1 typhoon (since it began developing an eye-like feature), but downgraded it to a tropical storm later that day.

The following day, the JTWC again upgraded Saola to a Category 1 typhoon. Later that day the JMA upgraded Saola to a typhoon, and the JTWC upgraded it to a category 2 typhoon early on August 1.

Typhoon Gener did not make landfall in the Philippines, and occupied a small portion of the northern Philippine Area of Responsibility (PAR). It pulled southwest-monsoon winds from the South China Sea and damaged the City of Manila, causing a storm surge and striking the fish ports of Navotas and Malabon. It broke a large part of the sea wall on Roxas Boulevard, and caused tons of refuse be washed onto the Baywalk. Portions of Metro Manila damaged by Typhoon Nesat (Pedring) in 2011 were under repair when the storm hit.

=== Initial aftermath ===
Shortly after the typhoon, the Department of Public Works and Highways (DPWH) and the Metropolitan Manila Development Authority (MMDA) ordered the clean-up of the coastal areas near Manila Bay. Initial reports indicated about a dozen confirmed casualties, but early on August 3, the National Disaster Risk Reduction and Management Council (NDRRMC) revised the death toll to 37 with at least 519,000 people affected. More than 17,500 were in evacuation centers. As of August 6, 51 fatalities were confirmed in the Philippines with six reported missing. Damage from the storm amounted to about ₱404 million (US$9.6 million), half of which was agricultural losses. When Gener left the PAR, its wind would eventually be exacerbated by Typhoon Haikui to cause heavy rainfall on August 6.

== August 3–4 ==
With strong winds, the La Mesa Dam in Novaliches was near overflowing.

== August 6 ==
=== Typhoon Haikui ===
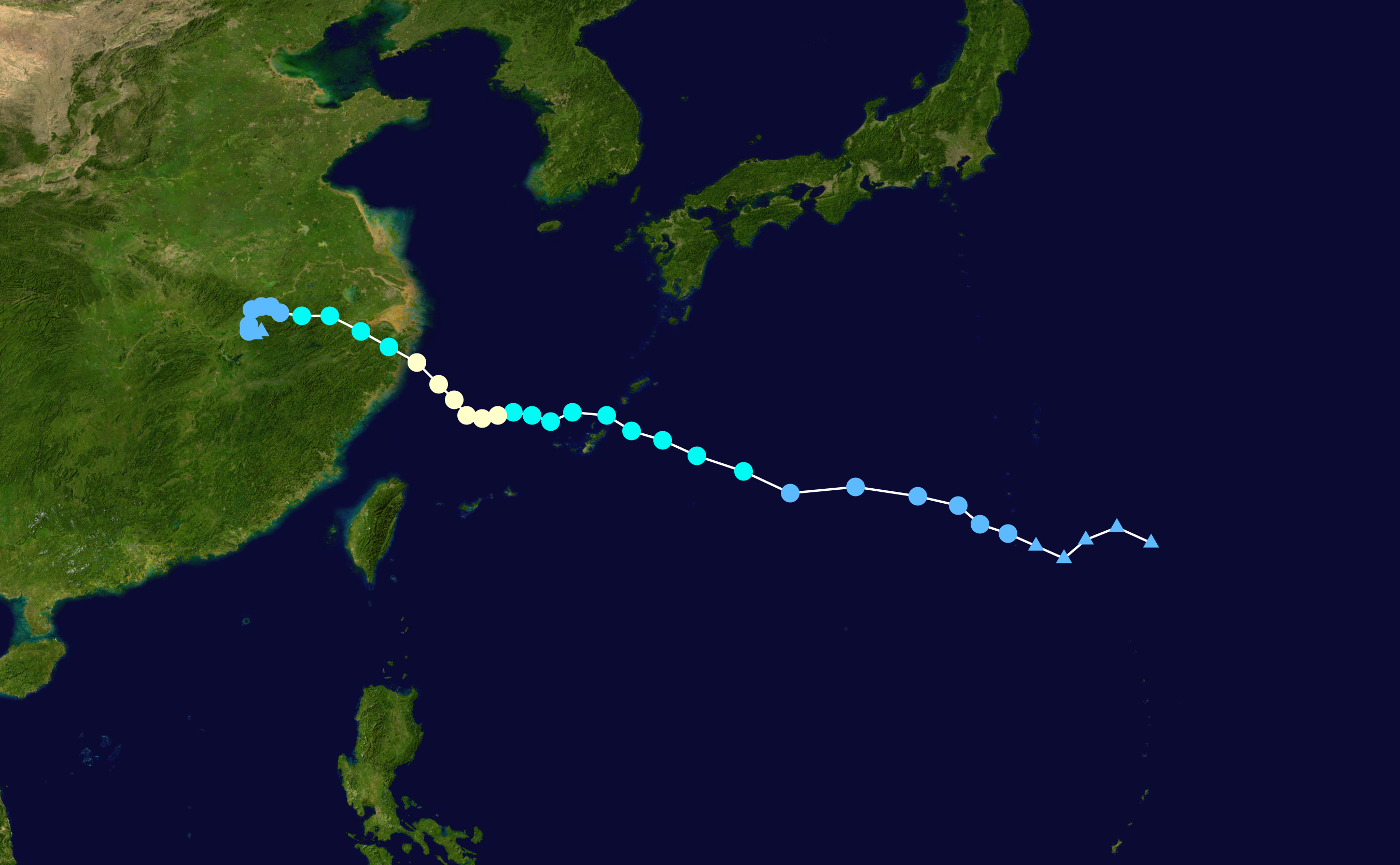
Map plotting the storm's track and intensity, according to the Saffir–Simpson scale Map key Saffir–Simpson scale Tropical depression (≤38 mph, ≤62 km/h) Tropical storm (39–73 mph, 63–118 km/h) Category 1 (74–95 mph, 119–153 km/h) Category 2 (96–110 mph, 154–177 km/h) Category 3 (111–129 mph, 178–208 km/h) Category 4 (130–156 mph, 209–251 km/h) Category 5 (≥157 mph, ≥252 km/h) Unknown Storm type Tropical cyclone Subtropical cyclone Extratropical cyclone, remnant low, tropical disturbance, or monsoon depression

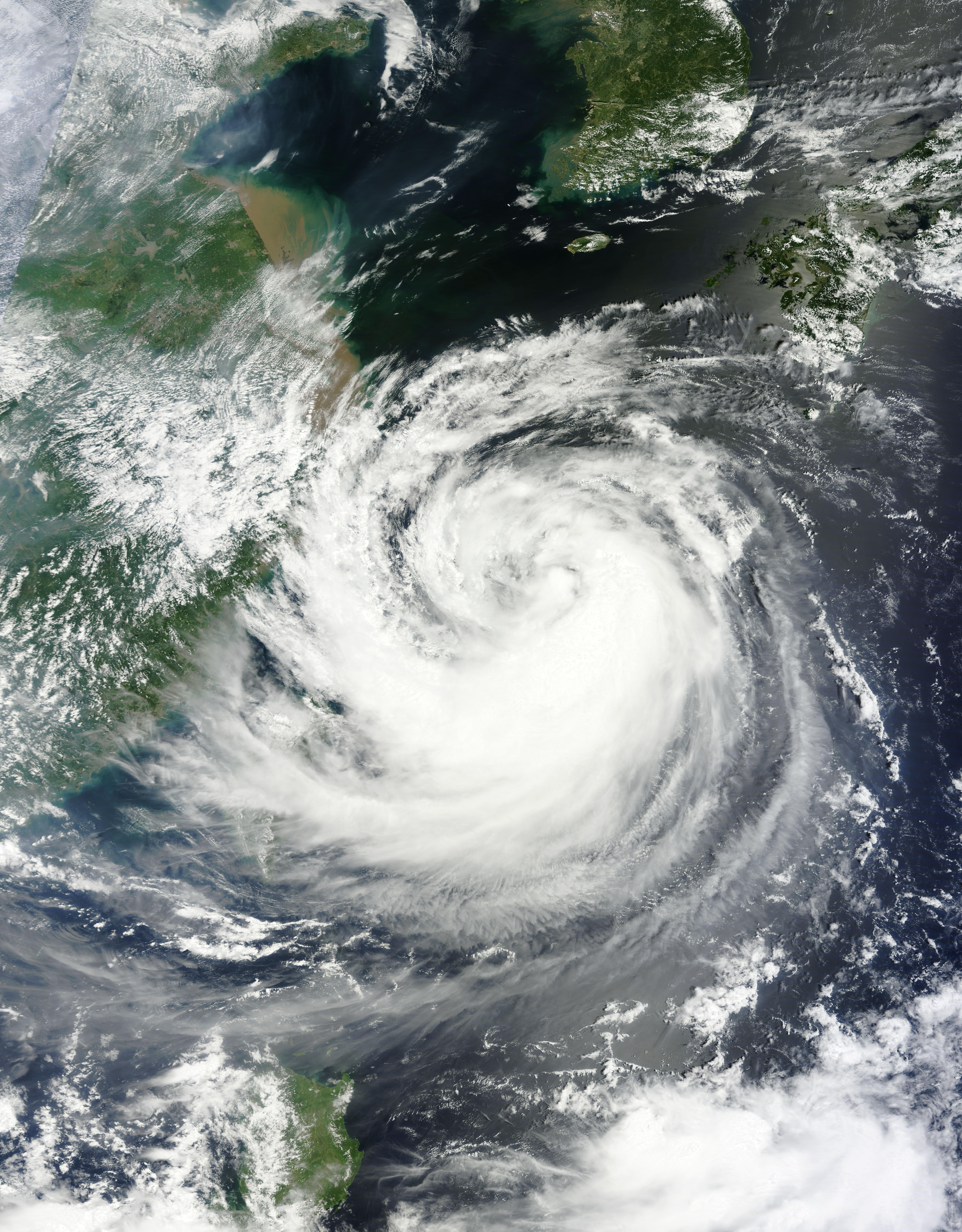
Haikui on August 6, 2012

Hundreds of kilometers from the Philippines, the southerly flow from Typhoon Haikui enhanced the southwest monsoon across much of Luzon. As a result, widespread heavy rains exacerbated by Haikui impacted regions recovering from deadly floods triggered by Typhoon Saola less than a week earlier. During a 72-hour period (August 6–8), 1,007 mm (39.6 in) of rain fell in parts of Metro Manila (leading local media to compare the event to Typhoon Ketsana in 2009, which killed 464 people in the city).

=== Marikina and Tullahan Rivers ===
The Marikina River, which overflowed during Typhoon Ketsana, again reached the deadly 19-meter level by 7:00 pm. Because of the rain, two of the La Mesa Dam's gates to the Tullahan River overflowed; the water flowed to Barangay Greater Lagro, flooding Lagro High School and the Regalado Highway (nearly 4 m (13 ft)). As a result of La Mesa Reservoir overflowing, the Tullahan flooded North and West Fairview and the Santa Lucia District. It submerged the Atherton Bridge in Fairview, and many houses along the banks were swept away. A number of schools in Metro Manila, Central Luzon and Calabarzon suspended classes, and as a precautionary measure officials cut power to some areas of Metro Manila. At least 250,000 people left their homes when flooding covered more than a third of the city. The head of the NDRRMC compared the flood to the scenes in the 1995 post-apocalyptic film Waterworld.

=== Landslide in Barangay Commonwealth ===
At 8:00 am, in the hills of the Commonwealth District in Quezon City, a rare landslide occurred which buried two houses (owned by the Baylon and Castulo families, and housing 12 people). The inhabitants were rushed to East Avenue Medical Center. Nine were declared dead on arrival: Jayson Baylon (age 16), Jayvee Baylon (20), Jissele Baylon (7), Cecilia Baylon (50), Jonathan Castulo (3), Junica Castulo (three weeks), Jessica and Jethro Baylon, and Joshua Castulo.

== August 7 ==
The worst flooding took place on August 7 along the Marikina River, which swelled to near-record levels. During the afternoon the river reached a height of 20.6 m (68 ft), well beyond the flood level of 16 m (52 ft) and about 3 m (9.8 ft) above its banks but below the record level set during Typhoon Ketsana. It again inundated Provident Village, among the villages most damaged by Ketsana. Flooding also occurred on Espana Boulevard and at the University of Santo Tomas (UST).

=== Munoz, Balintawak and Baesa ===
The northern district of Quezon City was heavily flooded by the Tullahan River. Most of the water flowed along Quirino Highway to the North Luzon Expressway (NLEX) and A. Bonifacio Street, and the Freeway was closed to traffic that afternoon. Flooding also occurred, from a creek in Munoz, causing flooding on EDSA and Roosevelt Avenue.

=== Roxas District, Tatalon and Damayan Lagi ===
These districts along Gregorio Araneta Avenue were damaged by Typhoon Ketsana. The creek under the median rose, and by noon flooding nearly reached two-story buildings and businesses along the Avenue and the nearby roads (particularly Gumamela Street and Eulogio Rodriguez Sr. Boulevard).

=== Manggahan Floodway and Laguna De Bay ===
The overflow from the Marikina River swelled the Manggahan Floodway, inundating Pasig and Taguig and overflowing Laguna de Bay. The swelling of the bay flooded the cities of San Pedro and Calamba in Laguna; both were declared in a state of emergency the following day.

=== City of Manila ===
The rain triggered several monsoon surges, which again flooded Roxas Boulevard and submerged the Quezon Boulevard Claro M. Recto Underpass in Quiapo and the Lagusnilad-Taft Avenue Underpass on Padre Burgos Street. Waist-high water flooded Manila City Hall, destroying files and documents.

=== Government response ===
In response to the flooding, the NDRRMC allocated about ₱13 million (US$311,000) in relief funds and deployed 202 people to assist in search-and-rescue operations; however, the operations were hampered by strong currents in flooded streets. President Benigno Aquino III ordered officials to maximize efforts to rescue and aid affected residents.

=== San Juan and Santa Mesa ===
The swelling of San Juan River caused flooding in Santa Mesa and San Juan, including the UERM Hospital. Several floors were inundated, and staff and patients experienced shortages of food and medicine. Patients were evacuated to the upper floors for their safety.

== August 8 ==
On August 8, more than a million families were affected. Metro Manila and nine nearby provinces in Luzon were under a state of calamity, with some areas flooded up to the second storey; seventy to ninety percent of Metro Manila was affected by flooding. Communications were heavily affected, as distress calls and text messages from thousands of Metro Manila residents and their families flooded television and radio stations, since most power and water services were interrupted. Although a red warning was downgraded to yellow during the morning, it was upgraded to red until midnight August 9 that afternoon after another round of heavy rain; some schools extended their suspension of classes. Airports also had severe flooding, cancelling flights or diverting them to Clark International Airport in Pampanga and other airports.

Some areas of Metro Manila were submerged up to 3 m (9.8 ft); city officials evacuated over 23,000 residents from flood-prone areas, moving them to shelters. According to a BBC News correspondent, many residents were reluctant to leave their belongings behind and some returned through floodwaters to retrieve their possessions. Officials feared that flooding could worsen as the La Mesa Dam continued to overflow.

== Aftermath ==
Throughout the Philippines a total of 89 people were confirmed dead, with seven listed as missing. A total of 8,428 homes were destroyed, and another 6,706 damaged. Losses throughout the country totaled at least ₱604.63 million (US$14.31 million).

== See also ==
- Typhoon Rita (1972)
- Typhoon Haikui (2012)
- Typhoon Saola
- 2012 Pacific typhoon season
- 2016 Philippine southwest monsoon floods
- 2025 Philippine monsoon floods
- Storms that brought major flooding in Manila:
  - Typhoon Ketsana (Ondoy, 2009)
  - Tropical Storm Fung-wong (Mario, 2014)
  - Tropical Storm Yagi (Karding, 2018)
  - Typhoon Vamco (Ulysses, 2020)
  - Typhoon Gaemi (Carina, 2024)
- Hurricane Sandy - a Category 3 hurricane that brought major flooding to much of the United States, often compared to the monsoon floods and happened in the same year
