= Tropical Storm Odette (2003) =

Atlantic tropical storm in 2003

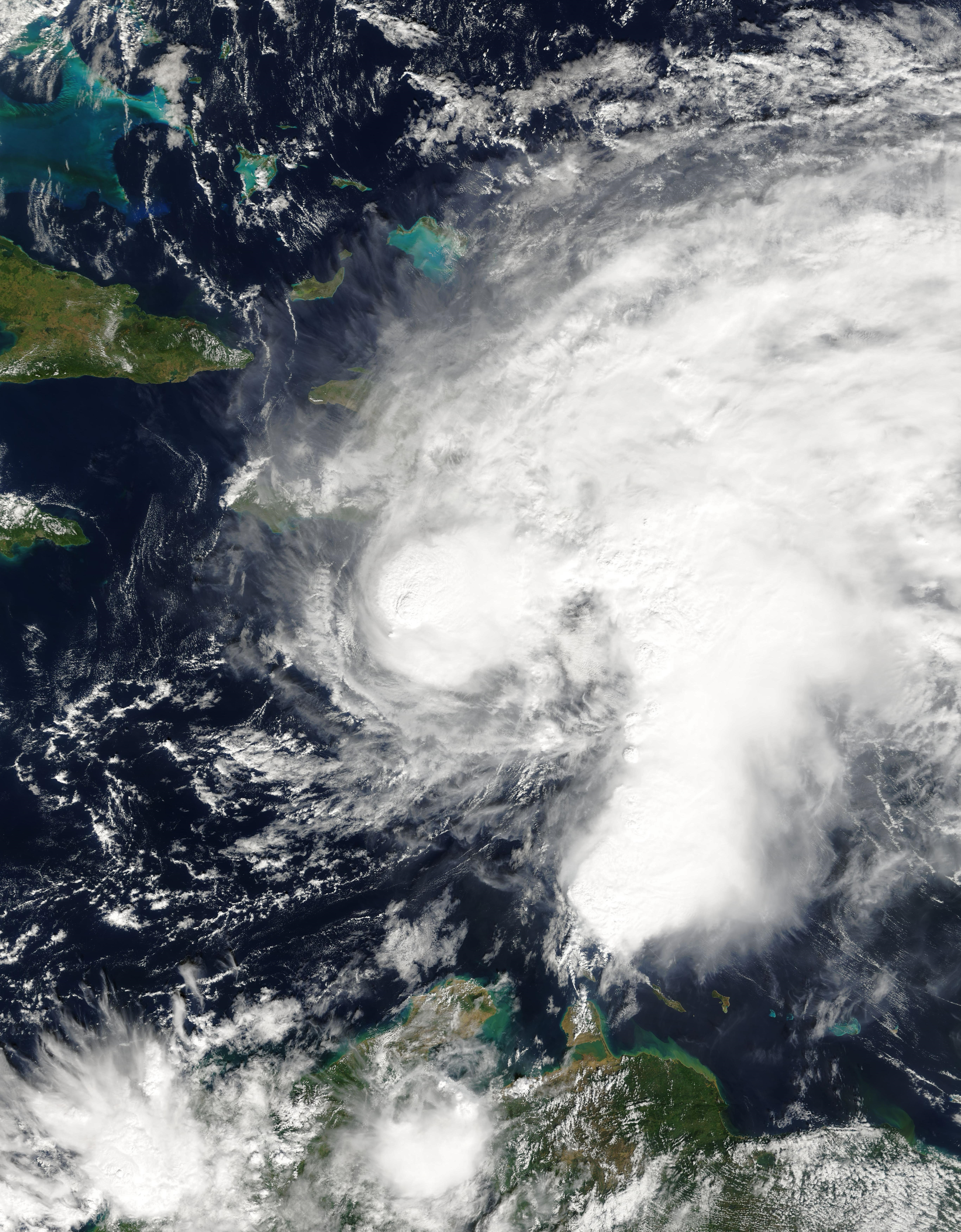
- Tropical Storm Odette approaching Hispaniola at peak intensity on December 6

Meteorological history
- Formed: December 4, 2003
- Extratropical: December 7, 2003
- Dissipated: December 9, 2003

Tropical storm
- 1-minute sustained (SSHWS/NWS)
- Highest winds: 65 mph (100 km/h)
- Lowest pressure: 993 mbar (hPa); 29.32 inHg

Overall effects
- Fatalities: 8 direct, 2 indirect
- Damage: $8 million (2003 USD)
- Areas affected: Colombia, Dominican Republic, Haiti, Puerto Rico
- IBTrACS
- Part of the 2003 Atlantic hurricane season

Tropical Storm Odette was a rare off-season tropical cyclone that hit the island of Hispaniola in early December 2003. The fifteenth named storm of the 2003 Atlantic hurricane season, Odette formed near the coast of Panama on December 4, a few days after the official end of the Atlantic hurricane season. The system achieved maximum winds of 65 mph (105 km/h) but weakened slightly before it ultimately made landfall in the Dominican Republic late on December 6. Odette weakened over land and became extratropical over the open Atlantic a day later, dissipating on December 9.

The storm dropped heavy rainfall over the Dominican Republic, with the resultant flooding and mudslides damaging tens of thousands of homes and severely affecting crops. Odette was also responsible for eight deaths and fourteen injuries. Crop damage in the Dominican Republic totaled to over $8 million (2003 USD, $14 million 2025 USD), however the total damage is unknown.

== Meteorological history ==
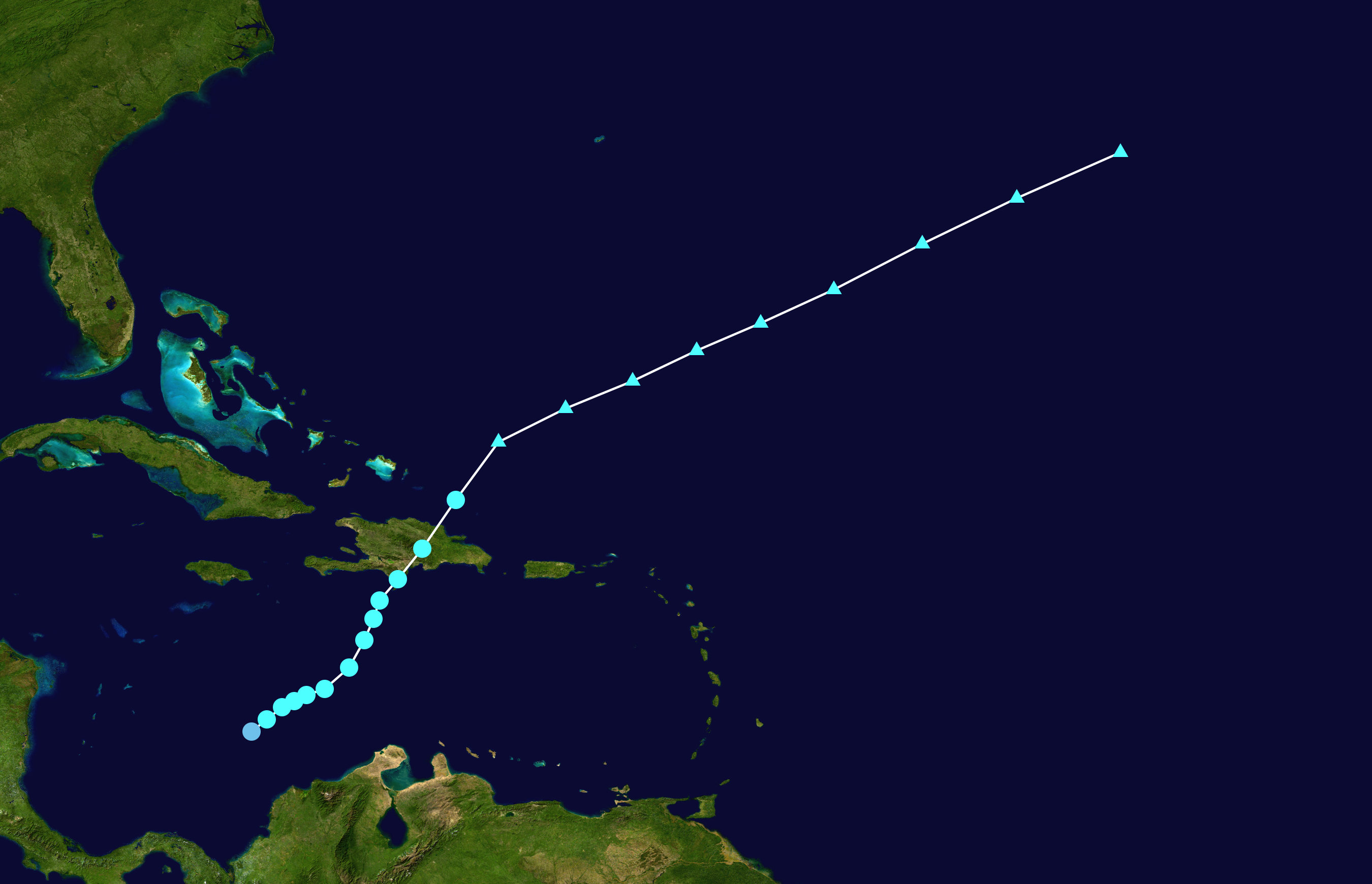
Map plotting the storm's track and intensity, according to the Saffir–Simpson scale Map key Saffir–Simpson scale Tropical depression (≤38 mph, ≤62 km/h) Tropical storm (39–73 mph, 63–118 km/h) Category 1 (74–95 mph, 119–153 km/h) Category 2 (96–110 mph, 154–177 km/h) Category 3 (111–129 mph, 178–208 km/h) Category 4 (130–156 mph, 209–251 km/h) Category 5 (≥157 mph, ≥252 km/h) Unknown Storm type Tropical cyclone Subtropical cyclone Extratropical cyclone, remnant low, tropical disturbance, or monsoon depression

By November 30, the last day of the Atlantic hurricane season, a stationary front extended across eastern Cuba into the southwestern Caribbean. On December 1, a low-pressure area developed within the frontal zone just north of Panama, and an anticyclone aloft produced good outflow over the low-level center. The low remained nearly stationary for the next several days, and it gradually became separated from the stationary front. Convection increased across the area due to moisture from the eastern Pacific Ocean and moderate divergence. Increased wind shear deteriorated the system on December 2, though convection redeveloped as the system started a northeast drift. On December 3 a mid-level circulation developed about 140 miles (230 km) north of the surface center. Convection increased and became better organized as a weak tropical wave reached the area, and it is estimated the system developed into Tropical Depression Twenty at around 12:00 UTC on December 4 while located about 345 miles (555 km) south of Kingston, Jamaica; initially, the depression was forecast to track north-northeastward and pass over western Haiti.

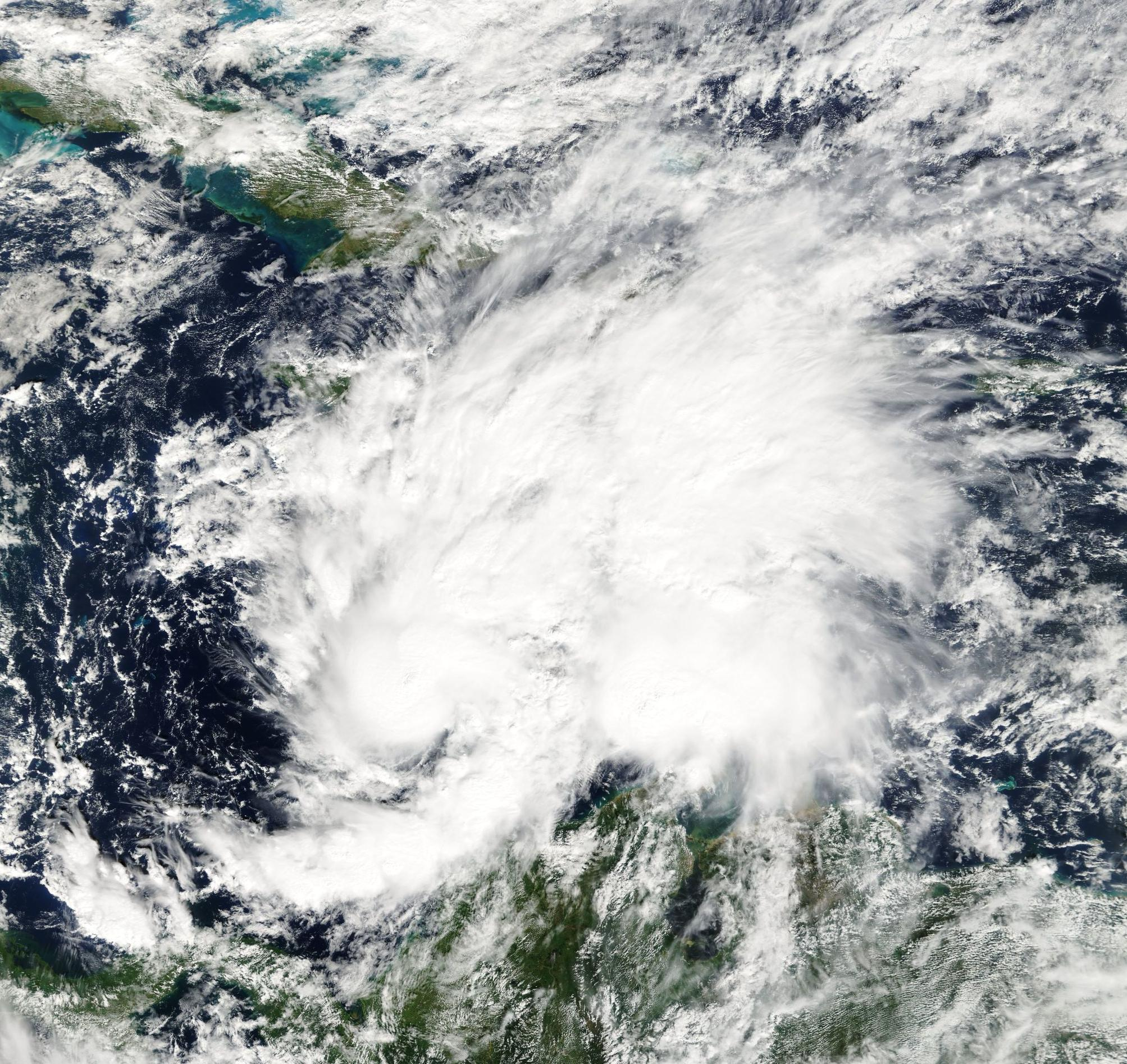
Tropical Storm Odette shortly after being named on December 4

Upon being classified as a tropical cyclone, the depression was embedded within the southwesterly flow between a ridge over the eastern Caribbean Sea and a mid-latitude trough, which caused a steady east-northeast motion. The convection organized into a central dense overcast with a well-defined cloud band wrapping partially around the center, and based on satellite imagery estimates the depression was upgraded to tropical storm status; late on December 4, the National Hurricane Center named the storm Odette. After being named, the storm intensified despite moderate southwesterly wind shear, and an eye feature became evident on microwave satellite imagery. Additionally, about three–fourths of a mid-level eyewall developed. The storm was assessed with winds of 40–50 mph (64–80 km/h), though the National Hurricane Center remarked the winds could have been stronger due to lack of structural data. The eye feature diminished as the convective structure deteriorated slightly, and hurricane hunters first flew into the storm at around 12:00 UTC on December 5. Odette tracked over an area of warm sea surface temperatures, and the overall cloud pattern gradually improved; the Geophysical Fluid Dynamics Laboratory predicted the storm to attain hurricane status. Early on December 6, a TRMM overpass showed an 80% closed eyewall, and at 0600 UTC Odette attained peak winds of 65 mph (105 km/h) while located about 245 miles (394 km)/h) southwest of Santo Domingo, Dominican Republic.

Upon reaching peak intensity, Odette had begun accelerating northeastward, which decreased wind shear and slightly increased its southwesterly outflow. The low-level center decelerated as it approached Hispaniola, though the convection continued quickly northeastward. Failing to maintain vertical organization, Odette weakened slightly and made landfall on Jaragua National Park, in the Pedernales Province of the Dominican Republic, around 23:00 UTC on December 6 with winds of 60 mph (95 km/h). The circulation became disrupted as it crossed the country, and on December 7 it emerged into the Atlantic Ocean with winds of 45 mph (70 km/h). It accelerated to the northeast ahead of an approaching cold front, and late on December 7 Odette transitioned into an extratropical cyclone as its center became embedded within the front. The remnants continued quickly northeastward before losing its identity within the frontal zone on December 9; the frontal zone that absorbed Odette also absorbed Tropical Storm Peter a few days later.

== Preparations ==
Prior to Odette's predicted arrival, the Dominican Republic government issued for the evacuation of more than 10,000 people, mostly from those living near rivers. At least 2,000 shelters were established, capable of housing up to 800,000 people. In addition, the government mobilized the army to force those unwilling to leave from their homes. Such precautions were taken due to already saturated grounds from heavy rainfall three weeks prior.

A tropical storm watch was issued between Santo Domingo and the Dominican Republic/Haiti border on December 4, 56 hours prior to landfall. This was raised to a tropical storm warning on December 5 while 32 hours before landfall. In addition, tropical storm warnings were issued for all of the Haitian coastline and Jamaica.

== Impact ==
While over the southwestern Caribbean Sea, Odette dropped heavy rainfall, including prior to its formation. For several days, the storm caused rains in Panama, Costa Rica, and the east coast of Nicaragua. In Colombia, the storm caused rainfall totals of up to 8 inches (200 mm) in Puerto Colombia. In Jamaica, the storm dropped moderate rainfall, flooding several roads in Saint Ann and Saint Mary Parishes. Odette caused moderate damage and 8 deaths in the Dominican Republic.

=== Dominican Republic ===
Winds from Tropical Storm Odette were relatively light across the Dominican Republic, with a peak gust of 60 mph occurring in Santo Domingo. The storm dropped heavy rainfall for several hours, amounting to a maximum of 9.07 inches (230 mm) in Isla Saona. Several other locations reported over 4 inches as well. The rainfall caused mudslides and flash flooding, forcing several rivers to overflow in combination with previous rains. In addition, a tornado was reported near Santo Domingo, destroying one house and uproofing several others.

The flooding and mudslides damaged up to 60,000 homes and destroyed 34. Gusty winds caused power outages. River flooding caused two bridges to collapse, isolating several communities. Landslides buried several roads, though authorities quickly repaired them. The rainfall also flooded fields, resulting in severe crop damage. As much as 85% of the banana crop was lost, while the coffee crop suffered losses shortly before harvest season. Crop damage totaled to around $8 million (2003 USD). In addition, excess flooding contaminated water supplies, leaving several areas without clean water or sanitation.

In all, Tropical Storm Odette caused 8 deaths and 14 injuries, mostly due to flash flooding and mudslides. In addition, two indirect deaths are associated with the storm due to heart attacks. Neighboring Haiti experienced little from the storm.

=== Puerto Rico and United States Virgin Islands ===
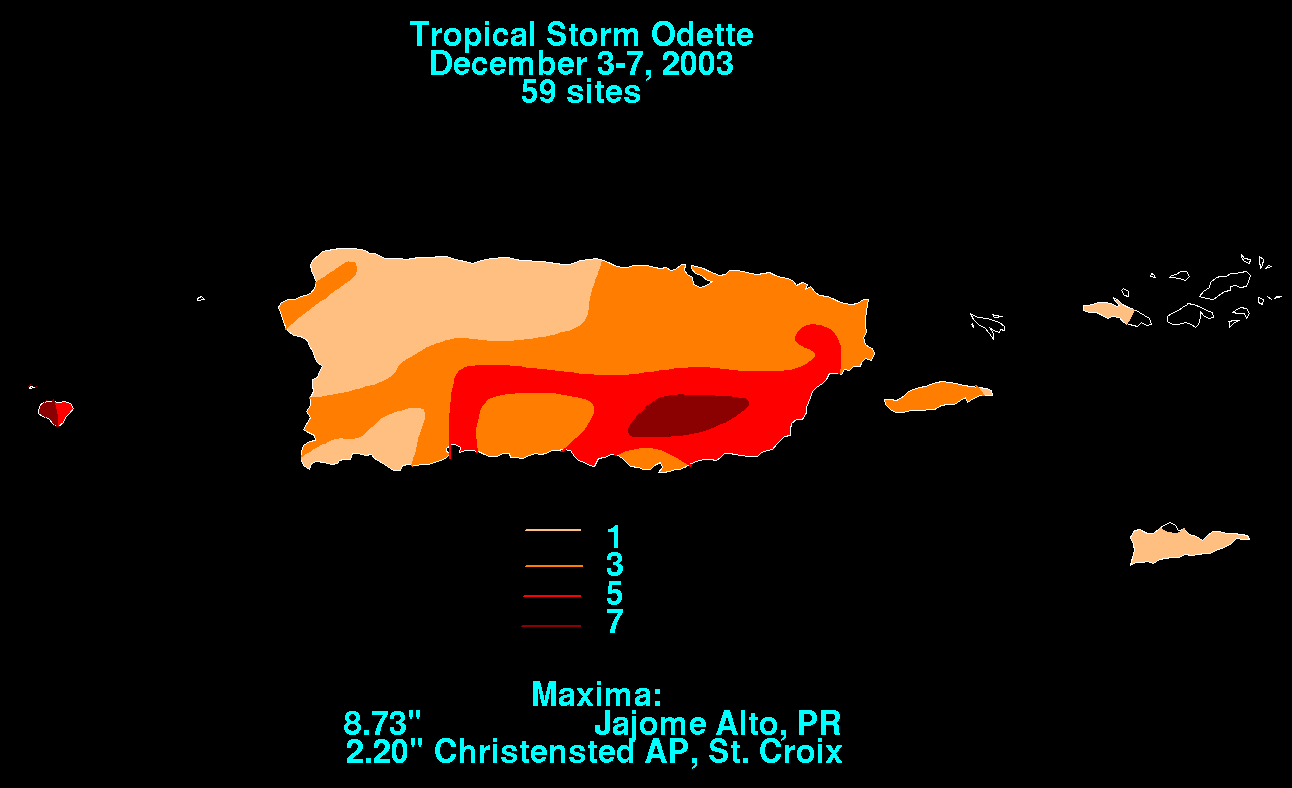
Rainfall totals from Odette

Though Odette passed 280 miles to the west of Mayagüez, Puerto Rico, the storm caused moderate rainfall across Puerto Rico and the United States Virgin Islands. Rainfall in Puerto Rico was heaviest in the southeast, where a peak of 8.73 inches (222 mm) was recorded in Jajome Alto. The storm also caused up to 2.2 inches (56 mm) of rainfall in Christiansted on Saint Croix.

Odette's rainfall caused flooding throughout Puerto Rico's rivers. The river flooding destroyed three bridges, resulting in $20,000 in damages (2003 USD). The flooding also caused a mudslide near a cemetery in Humacao. The rainfall also covered numerous roads, though overall damage was minimal throughout Puerto Rico and the Virgin Islands.

== Aftermath and records ==
In all, 65,000 people were affected by Tropical Storm Odette. The Dominican Republic Red Cross and Red Crescent deployed 105 volunteers to the impacted areas, primarily in the area of Monte Cristi. The organization provided food and hygiene kits to thousands of people, as well as mosquito nets. The Red Cross also gave a 5,000 liter water tank for the citizens in Monte Cristi, an area without clean water or sanitation.

When Odette formed on December 4, it became the first tropical storm since the beginning of the modern tropical cyclone record to form in the Caribbean in the month of December; a documented December Caribbean hurricane occurred in 1822. However, Tropical Storm Karen, which formed in November 1989, persisted until December while located in the northwestern Caribbean Sea. In addition, Odette was the first Atlantic storm to form in the month of December since Hurricane Lili in 1984.

The 2003 season was the first season since 1954 to have a pre-season storm and a post-season storm, with Ana in April and Odette.

== See also ==
- Tropical cyclones in 2003
- Weather of 2003
- List of off-season Atlantic hurricanes
- List of wettest tropical cyclones by country
- For other storms of the same name
- Hurricane Lenny (1999) – A Category 4 hurricane with a very unusual track caused damage between the Dominican Republic and Puerto Rico.
- Hurricane Omar (2008) – A Category 4 hurricane with a similar track.
