= Typhoon Haikui (2012) =

Pacific Typhoon in 2012

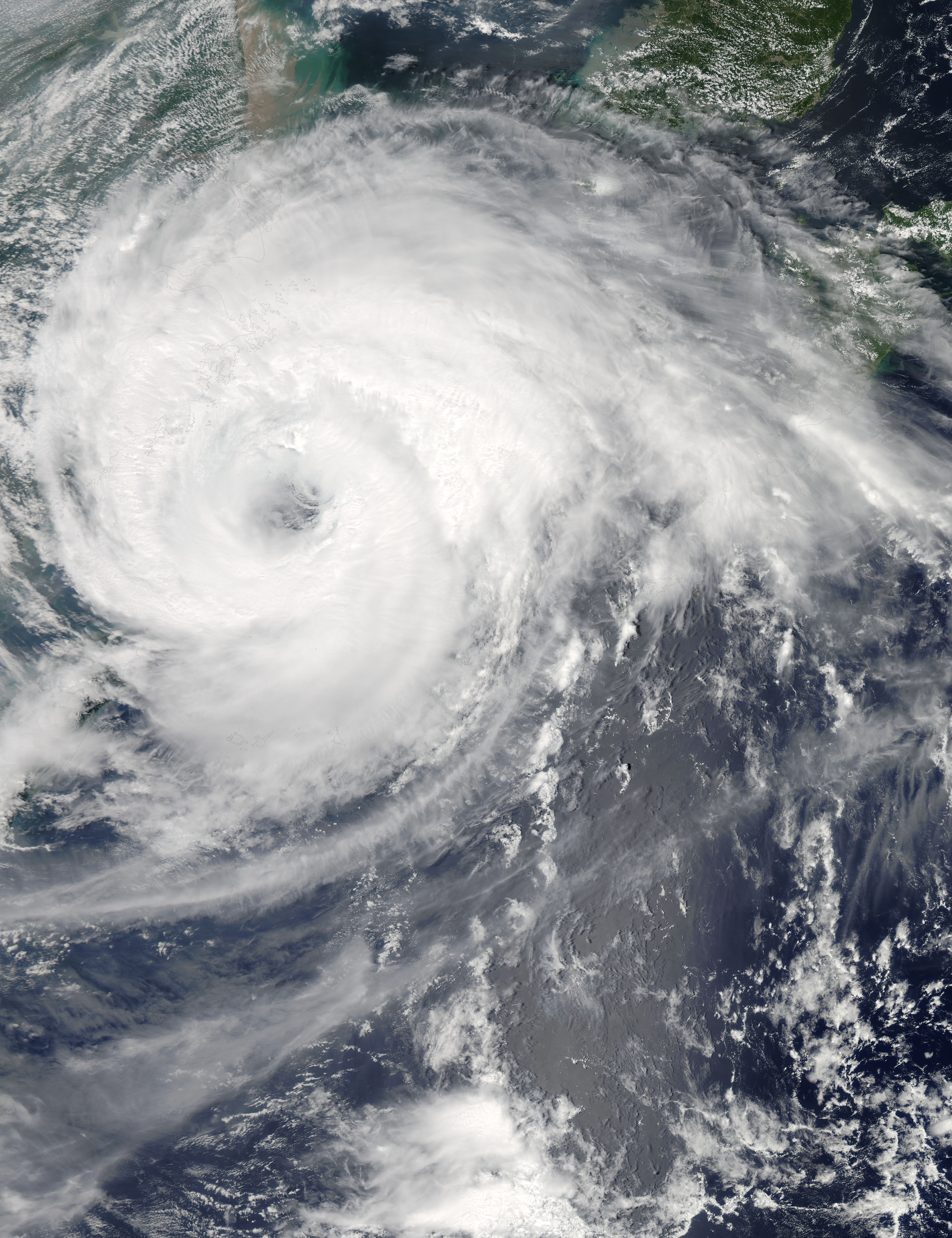
- Typhoon Haikui near peak intensity approaching Eastern China on August 7

Meteorological history
- Formed: August 1, 2012
- Dissipated: August 11, 2012

Typhoon
- 10-minute sustained (JMA)
- Highest winds: 120 km/h (75 mph)
- Lowest pressure: 965 hPa (mbar); 28.50 inHg

Category 1-equivalent typhoon
- 1-minute sustained (SSHWS/JTWC)
- Highest winds: 120 km/h (75 mph)
- Lowest pressure: 974 hPa (mbar); 28.76 inHg

Overall effects
- Fatalities: 118 total
- Damage: $5.91 billion (2012 USD)
- Areas affected: Philippines, Ryukyu Islands, Taiwan, China
- IBTrACS
- Part of the 2012 Pacific typhoon season

Typhoon Haikui was the third tropical cyclone in the span of a week to impact Mainland China during late July and early August 2012.

== Meteorological history ==
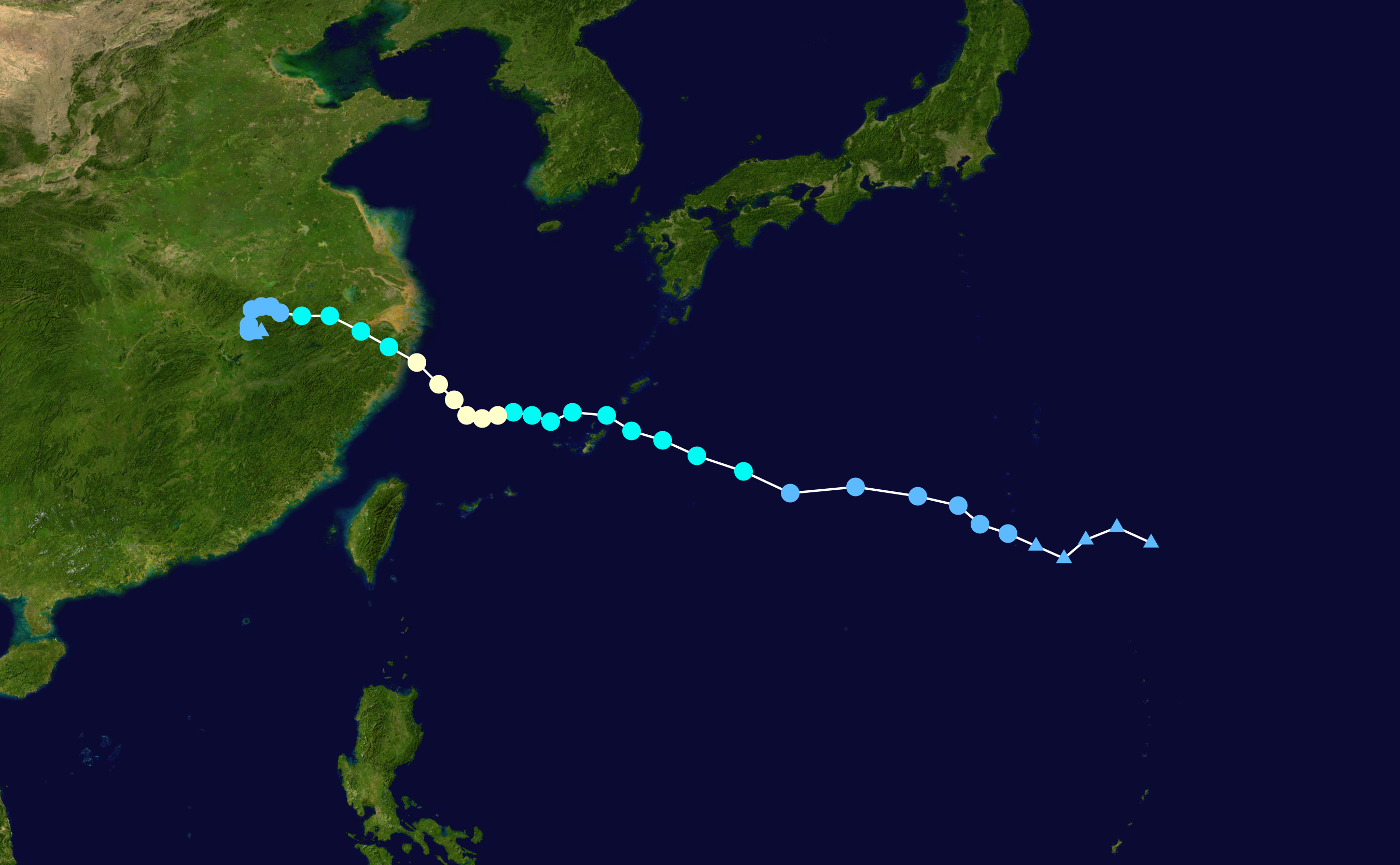
Map plotting the storm's track and intensity, according to the Saffir–Simpson scale Map key Saffir–Simpson scale Tropical depression (≤38 mph, ≤62 km/h) Tropical storm (39–73 mph, 63–118 km/h) Category 1 (74–95 mph, 119–153 km/h) Category 2 (96–110 mph, 154–177 km/h) Category 3 (111–129 mph, 178–208 km/h) Category 4 (130–156 mph, 209–251 km/h) Category 5 (≥157 mph, ≥252 km/h) Unknown Storm type Tropical cyclone Subtropical cyclone Extratropical cyclone, remnant low, tropical disturbance, or monsoon depression

At 06:00 UTC on August 1, the Joint Typhoon Warning Center (JTWC) began to monitor an area of convection, associated with a gale-force non-tropical low embedded within the eastern end of a monsoon trough, located approximately 550 nmi (1,020 km; 630 mi) to the north of Guam. At the time, the low had a poorly defined low-level circulation center, with a large area of deep convection surrounding it, and was under an environment of good equatorial outflow and moderate wind shear. Six hours later, the Japan Meteorological Agency (JMA) upgraded the low to a tropical depression. As the system was developing its center rapidly under increased wind shear, the JTWC issued a Tropical Cyclone Formation Alert (TCFA) late on the same day. Although it lacked deep convection near its center, the JTWC started issuing advisories on the depression at 21:00 UTC the next day, designating it as 12W. The JMA subsequently upgraded it to a tropical storm three hours later, naming it as Haikui. (Note: The name Haikui (Mandarin: 海葵, [xaɪ˨˩˦ kʰweɪ˧˥]) was contributed by China and means sea anemone in Mandarin.)

Moving westward under the southern periphery of a deep subtropical ridge to its north, Haikui continued organizing, with formative banding feeding to the northern side of its ragged center. By August 4, the JTWC upgraded the system to a tropical storm, as persistent deep convection built over its center; however, the system had a dry air intrusion in the upper levels, which wrapped into its west and southern quadrants. It later resumed its strengthening, as the dry air began to thin and its convection rebuilding over the system. As it passed near Okinawa by the next day, the JMA reported that Haikui had intensified to a severe tropical storm. By August 6, the system became partially exposed at its northern side, and had slowed its movement down due to the steering subtropical ridge weakening because of a mid-latitude trough developing over the Sea of Japan. However, the trough passed to the northeast, allowing for the ridge to build back on the system. Under an environment of 27–29 °C (81–84 °F) sea surface temperatures and weak wind shear, Haikui intensified to a Category 1-equivalent typhoon on the Saffir-Simpson scale at 15:00 UTC that same day.

By the next day, Haikui developed a large, 50 nmi (93 km; 58 mi) ragged eye as it continued west-northwest, nearing China. At 12:00 UTC that same day, the JMA upgraded the system to a typhoon; however, the storm began to deteriorate, as its eye became elongated, with the convection being more shallow and loose. At 19:20 UTC, Haikui made landfall on Xiangshan County, Zhejiang, China, at typhoon strength. Both the JMA and JTWC downgraded the system by the next day, to a severe tropical storm and a tropical storm respectively, with the latter issuing its final advisory as it tracked slowly inland. The JMA later downgraded the system to a tropical storm. Continuing west-northwest, it reached Anhui Province by 15:00 UTC that same day. Haikui then further weakened to a tropical depression on August 9, before the JMA ceased issuing advisories on the system late on the same day. The remnants of Haikui remained stationary inland, before dissipating two days later.

== Preparations and impact ==
=== Philippines ===
Although located hundreds of kilometres away from the Philippines, the southerly flow from Typhoon Haikui enhanced the southwest monsoon across much of Luzon. As a result, widespread heavy rains impacted regions still recovering from deadly floods triggered by Typhoon Saola less than a week earlier. During a 72‑hour span from 6–8 August, 1,007 mm (39.6 in) of rain fell in parts of Metro Manila, leading local media to compare the event to Typhoon Ketsana in 2009, which killed 464 in the city. Some of the most severe flooding took place along the Marikina River, which swelled to near-record levels. During the afternoon of 7 August, the river reached a height of 20.6 m (68 ft), well beyond the flood level of 16 m (52 ft) and about 3 m (9.8 ft) below the record level set during Typhoon Ketsana. About 70 percent of Metro Manila were affected by flooding. Some areas were submerged in up to 3 m (9.8 ft). Due to the expanding floods, officials in the city evacuated more than 23,000 residents from flood-prone areas and relocated them to shelters set up across the area. According to a reporter from the British Broadcasting Corporation, many residents were reluctant to leave their belongings behind, and some traveled back through flood waters to retrieve their belongings. Officials feared the flooding could worsen as the La Mesa Dam continued to overflow by then. At least nine people were killed and four others were injured in a landslide in Quezon City.

Numerous schools in Metro Manila, Central Luzon, and Calabarzon had suspended classes. As a precautionary measure, officials cut power to some areas of National Capital Region (NCR). At least 250,000 people left their homes as flooding covered more than a third of the city. The head of the National Disaster Risk Reduction and Management Council (NDRRMC) compared the deluge to the Kevin Costner film Waterworld.

In response to the flooding, the NDRRMC allocated approximately ₱13,000,000 worth of relief funds and deployed 202 personnel to assist in search and rescue missions. The search and rescue missions were hampered by strong currents in flooded streets. Philippine President Benigno Aquino ordered officials to maximize the effort on rescuing and aiding affected residents.

On 8 August, more than 1 million families were already affected. The NCR and nine nearby provinces were already placed under a state of calamity, with some areas were flooded up to 2 storeys. 90 percent of Metro Manila were already submerged in flooding. Communications were affected badly, though distress calls and SMS from thousands of Metro Manila residents and their worried relatives flooded television and radio stations as most power and water connections were lost. Red warning was already downed to yellow during morning but turned back into red warning during afternoon after another set of continuous heavy rain falls again in Metro Manila until midnight of August 9, 2012. Some schools extended their suspension of classes until Saturday. Airports also had severe flooding, forcing some flights to land at Clark International Airport in Pampanga and other airports nationwide or altogether rebooking.

Throughout the Philippines, a total of 112 people have been confirmed dead and 14 people were injured. In terms of damage, a total of 14,280 homes were damaged, of which 3,871 were totally destroyed. Economic losses were totalled at ₱3.18 billion (US$76.3 million), in which most of them were agricultural loss.

=== Japan ===
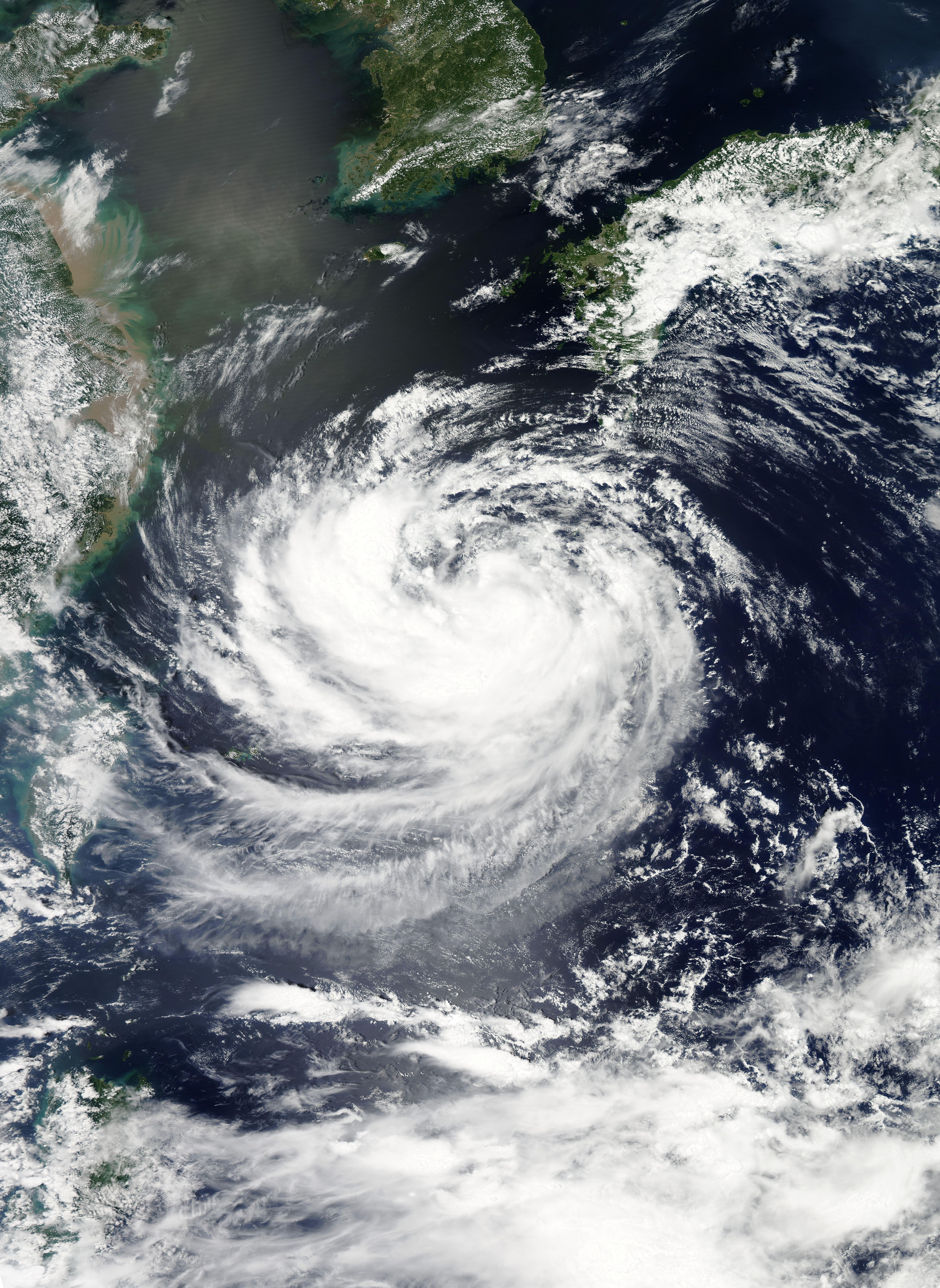
Tropical Storm Haikui over the Ryukyu Islands, Japan on August 5

Slowly moving through the Ryukyu Islands for several days, Haikui brought a prolonged period of heavy rain and high winds to several islands. On Okinawa, sustained winds peaked at 72 km/h (45 mph) and gusts were recorded up to 122 km/h (76 mph). Rainfall amounted to about 9 in (230 mm), bringing several dams to full or near-full capacity. No reports of major damage were received on Okinawa, though numerous tree limbs were downed across the island. A total of 353 flights to and from Naha International Airport were canceled, affecting more than 70,000 passengers.

=== China ===
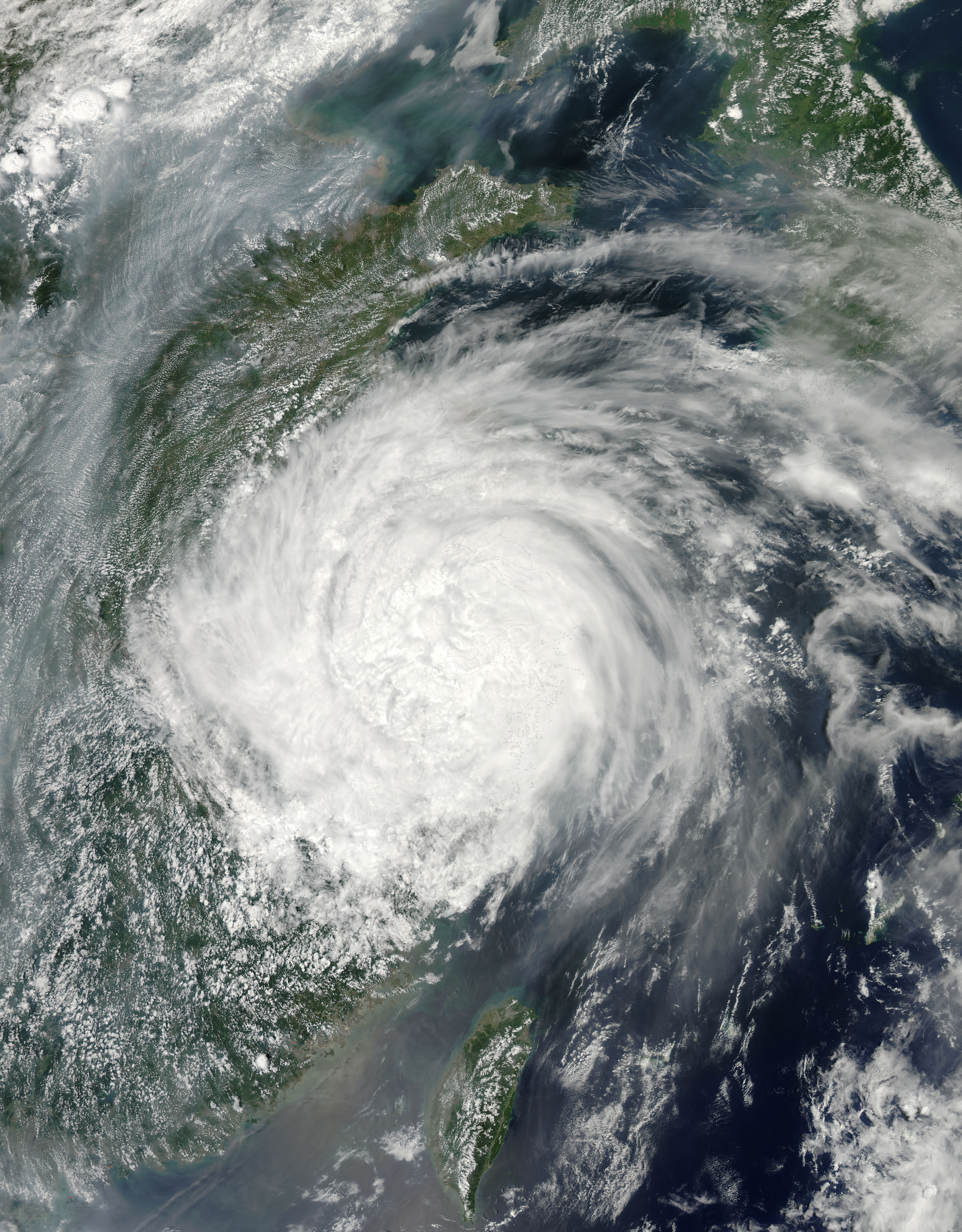
Severe Tropical Storm Haikui over Eastern China on August 8

On August 7, officials in Shanghai closed all parks, banned outdoor activities, canceled summer classes, and suspended outdoor construction. At least 200,000 in the city alone were evacuated and another 256,000 were relocated in neighboring Zhejiang Province. Port officials also called 30,000 ships back to shore to ride out the storm. Throughout the country, an estimated one million people were evacuated ahead of the storm's arrival. In Anhui Province, officials temporarily closed access to the Huangshan mountain range, a UNESCO World Heritage Site. Approximately 19,000 people in the area were also evacuated due to the threat of high winds and heavy rain.

Across Zhejiang Province, Haikui caused widespread and severe damage. According to the local flood and drought relief headquarters, 4,452 homes were destroyed and 184,800 hectares were submerged in flood waters. In Sanmen County, where the storm made landfall, nearly 100 villages lost power. In the province alone, economic losses were estimated in excess of ¥10 billion (US$1.57 billion). Additionally, an estimated 4.03 million people were affected by the storm. In Shanghai, two people were killed and seven others were injured in storm-related accidents. On the morning of August 10, the Shenjiakeng Reservoir in Zhoushan collapsed, flooding the surrounding area and killing at least ten people. Local officials "vowed to make all-out efforts to locate the missing" according to the Xinhua News Agency. Local residents feared the death toll could rise significantly as many people living in the area were undocumented migrant workers from other provinces. There has also been criticism over the effectiveness of the rescue effort, with one resident stating that it took an hour for rescue personnel to arrive in the area after the dam collapsed. Hospitals around the disaster area were reportedly overwhelmed with an influx of casualties stemming from the collapse, though no number was stated.

Heavy rains, in excess of 600 mm (24 in) in Anhui Province triggered severe flooding that destroyed 4,473 homes and affected 3 million people. Authorities evacuated approximately 156,000 people in the province. High winds, measured up to 117 km/h (73 mph) on Mount Guangming in the Huangshan mountain range, left 962,000 households without power. At least three people were killed in the province and economic losses amounted to ¥3.28 billion (US$515 million). One person was also killed in Jiangsu Province. In Jiangxi Province, heavy rains, measured up to 328 mm (12.9 in) in Jingdezhen, triggered significant floods that affected more than one million people. More than 145,000 people were relocated as homes became submerged in water. Flooding along the Wuhu-Guixi Railway line stranded 12 trains and trapped thousands of people. In one train, more than 1,000 people were trapped for 10 hours as repairs were conducted.

In the wake of widespread flooding brought about by the typhoon, the National Commission for Disaster Reduction and the Ministry of Civil Affairs activated level four emergency plans in Anhui, Jiangxi, Shanghai, and Zhejiang Provinces. Relief teams were dispatched to the four provinces to assist in relief efforts. In all, 6 people were killed, and total economic losses amounted to be CNY 37.09 billion (US$5.83 billion).

== See also ==
- 2012 Philippines flooding
- Typhoon Ketsana
- Typhoon Rananim
- Typhoon Saomai
- Tropical Storm Trami (2013)
- Tropical Storm Fung-wong (2014)
- Typhoon Maria (2018)
- Typhoon Lekima
- Typhoon Khanun (2023)
