= List of storms named Odette =

The name Odette has been used for nine tropical cyclones worldwide.

In the Atlantic Ocean:

- Tropical Storm Odette (2003), an off-season storm that formed near the coast of Panama and made landfall in the Dominican Republic.
- Tropical Storm Odette (2021), a weak, short-lived storm that formed off the Mid-Atlantic U.S. coast and moved out to sea.

In the Western Pacific:

The name has been used for three tropical cyclones in the Philippine Area of Responsibility by PAGASA. It replaced the name Ondoy after it was retired following the 2009 Pacific typhoon season.

- Typhoon Usagi (2013) (T1319, 17W, Odette), a Category 4-equivalent super typhoon that affected parts of the Philippines, Taiwan, and China.
- Typhoon Khanun (2017) (T1720, 24W, Odette), a mid-range Category 2 typhoon that affected Hainan island as a weak tropical storm.
- Typhoon Rai (2021) (T2122, 28W, Odette), a Category 5-equivalent super typhoon that caused severe and widespread damage in the Southern Philippines.

The name Odette was retired following the 2021 Pacific typhoon season and was replaced with Opong for 2025.

In the South-West Indian Ocean:

- Tropical Storm Odette (1971), a rare off-season tropical storm in the South-West Indian Ocean.

In the Australian Region:

- Cyclone Odette (1985), formed off the coast of Queensland and moved across the Coral Sea.
- Tropical Low Odette (2007), formed in the Coral Sea, causing heavy swell along the coast of Queensland.
- Cyclone Odette (2021), formed off the coast of Western Australia and was soon fully absorbed into the circulation of Cyclone Seroja.
