= Broadsheet (website) =

Australian online city guide, with some print editions

- Website type: News and culture website/magazine
- Available in: English
- Owner: Broadsheet Media
- Website: broadsheet.com.au
- Commercial: Yes
- Registration: Optional
- Launched: October 2009; 16 years ago
- Current status: Active

Broadsheet is an Australian mostly online city guide and culture magazine, founded by Nick Shelton in October 2009 and as of 2025 still run by him. The website covers news related to food and drink, fashion, art and design, entertainment, and health and fitness. It also has an extensive directory of cafes, restaurants, bars and shops which contains imagery and short descriptions of each venue. Print editions have been produced in the past.

== History ==
Nick Shelton was living in London circa 2005 and 2006, and working as a barista. When he returned home to Melbourne, he was impressed by the culinary scene but noticed no one was covering it in depth. He launched Broadsheet at the end of 2009 with the aim of helping readers find the best places to eat, drink and shop.

Former Studio Round employee Rhys Gorgol founded a graphic design agency, "The Company You Keep", in 2012. It shares an office with Broadsheet and handles its design work, as well as taking on external clients.

In 2011, Broadsheet launched in Sydney. In March 2011, the website ran a pop-up cafe in Melbourne, The Broadsheet Cafe, for 11 days. In June 2015 it opened a pop-up restaurant in Melbourne, The Broadsheet Restaurant, lasting for two months. A pop-up restaurant is planned for Sydney in 2016.

As of March 2014, the site received approximately 450,000 unique visitors per month.

Broadsheet launched two cookbooks in October 2015 based on cafes, restaurants and bars from Melbourne and Sydney.

In late April 2016, Broadsheet lead a national roll-out, launching in Adelaide, Brisbane and Perth.

Broadsheet's print papers, first appearing in 2009, relaunched in 2018 after a three-year hiatus, scheduled to be printed six times a year in Melbourne and Sydney and four times a year in Adelaide, Brisbane and Perth. However, as of 2021, these are not described on the website.

== Description ==
As of 2025, Nick Shelton is still overall director and publisher of the brand. There are offices in Melbourne and Sydney, and separate online editions for Adelaide, Brisbane and Perth handled by a dedicated editor.

There are separate versions of the site for Melbourne, Sydney, Adelaide, Brisbane and Perth. Each site's front page hosts a rotating selection of short news stories about restaurant, bar, cafe and shop openings, as well as longer interviews and features related to these fields. Broadsheet does not review restaurants in the traditional sense. "The philosophy is that we only write about what we like. If there’s a restaurant we don't like, we don't write about it," Shelton said in 2015 interview.

The site is supported by advertising.
