= Typhoon Ketsana =

Pacific typhoon in 2009

Typhoon Ketsana (Ondoy)
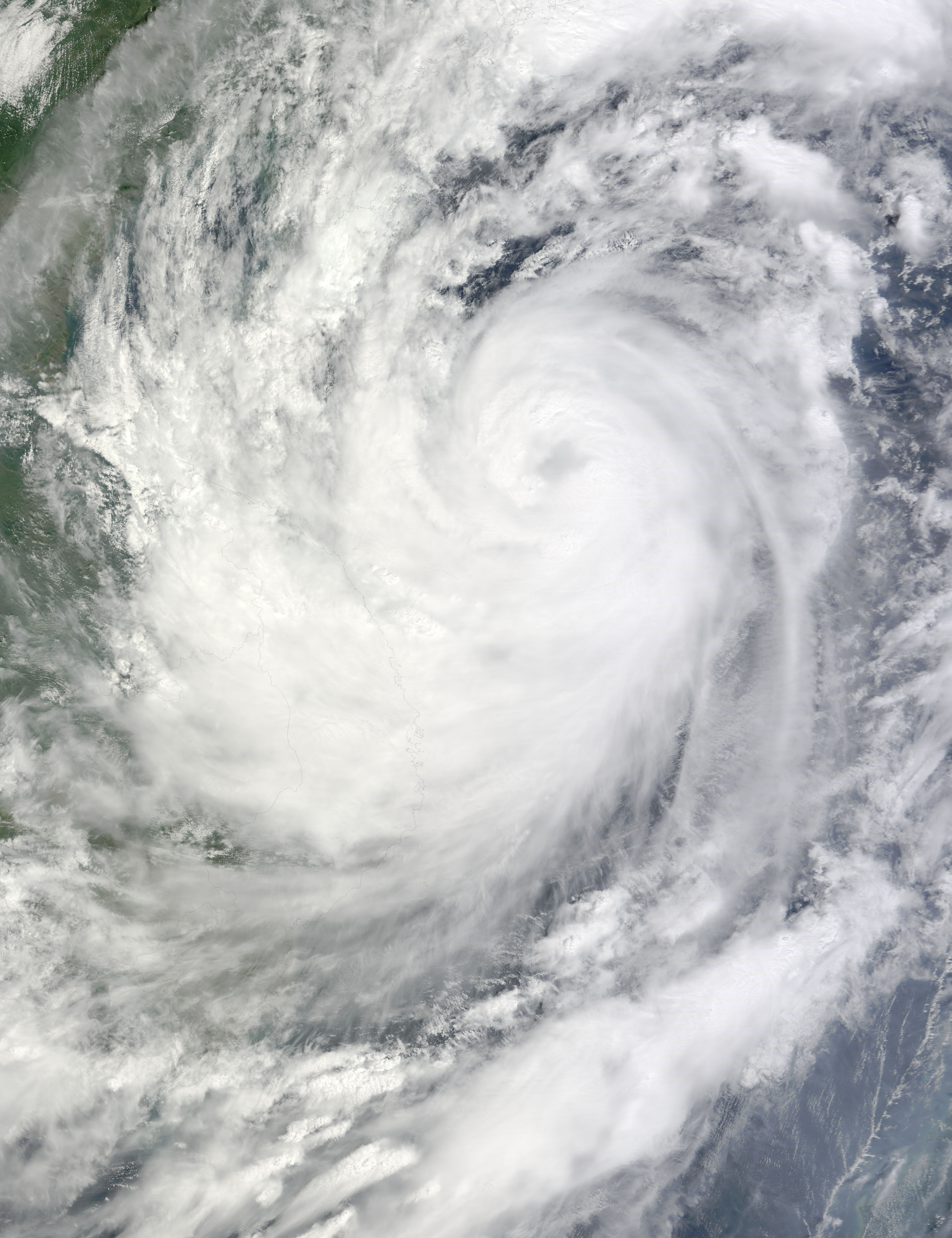
- Ketsana prior to peak intensity on September 28

Meteorological history
- Formed: September 24, 2009
- Dissipated: September 30, 2009

Typhoon
- 10-minute sustained (JMA)
- Highest winds: 130 km/h (80 mph)
- Lowest pressure: 960 hPa (mbar); 28.35 inHg

Category 2-equivalent typhoon
- 1-minute sustained (SSHWS/JTWC)
- Highest winds: 165 km/h (105 mph)
- Lowest pressure: 955 hPa (mbar); 28.20 inHg

Overall effects
- Fatalities: 921 direct
- Missing: 439
- Damage: $1.15 billion (2009 USD)
- Areas affected: Philippines, China, Vietnam, Laos, Cambodia, Thailand
- IBTrACS
- Part of the 2009 Pacific typhoon season

Typhoon Ketsana, (Note: The name Ketsana (Lao: ເກດສະໜາ, [keːt̚˧˩.sa(ʔ˧˥).naː˩(˧)]) was contributed by Laos and means agarwood (Aquilaria crassna) in Lao.) known in the Philippines as Tropical Storm Ondoy was a catastrophic tropical cyclone that caused extensive damages across Southeast Asia, particularly in the Philippines and Vietnam. It is both the second deadliest and costliest typhoon of the 2009 Pacific typhoon season, with at least $1.15 billion in damages, trailing behind Morakot with damages worth $6.2 billion, and 921 fatalities.

The sixteenth tropical storm and eighth typhoon of the season, Ketsana formed early about 860 km (530 mi) northwest of Palau on September 23, 2009. Initially, it was downgraded to a low pressure area by the Japan Meteorological Agency (JMA), but after drifting through favorable conditions, it intensified the next day and was categorized as a tropical depression by the Philippine Atmospheric, Geophysical and Astronomical Services Administration (PAGASA), and was given the name Ondoy after entering the Philippine Area of Responsibility. The Joint Typhoon Warning Center (JTWC) issued a Tropical Cyclone Formation Alert on the depression. It was then upgraded to a tropical depression by the JMA later that morning before the JTWC followed suit early on September 25, designating the depression as 17W. Soon, the depression strengthened into a tropical storm, and was given the name Ketsana by the JMA. Shortly after, it made landfall over the Philippines, and as it moved into the South China Sea, the storm intensified while moving towards the west. It peaked as a Category 2-equivalent typhoon before ultimately making landfall on Vietnam at peak intensity on September 29, dissipating on the next day.

While Ketsana made landfall north of Metro Manila as a tropical storm, it enhanced the southwest monsoon, bringing record-breaking rainfall and flooding across the Philippines' capital. At least 464 deaths (Note: Attributed to multiple references.) and $237 million (₱11.1 billion) were attributed to the typhoon, making it the most devastating tropical cyclone to hit Metro Manila, surpassing Typhoon Patsy (Yoling) in 1970. Flood water levels also reached a record 20 feet (6.1 m) in rural areas. In response to this, President Gloria Macapagal Arroyo declared a "state of calamity" encompassing most of Luzon after at least 86 people were initially reported dead in landslides and other incidents. Recovery efforts from the storm's onslaught would later be hampered by Typhoon Parma, which made landfall in the Philippines roughly a week after Ketsana.

== Meteorological history ==
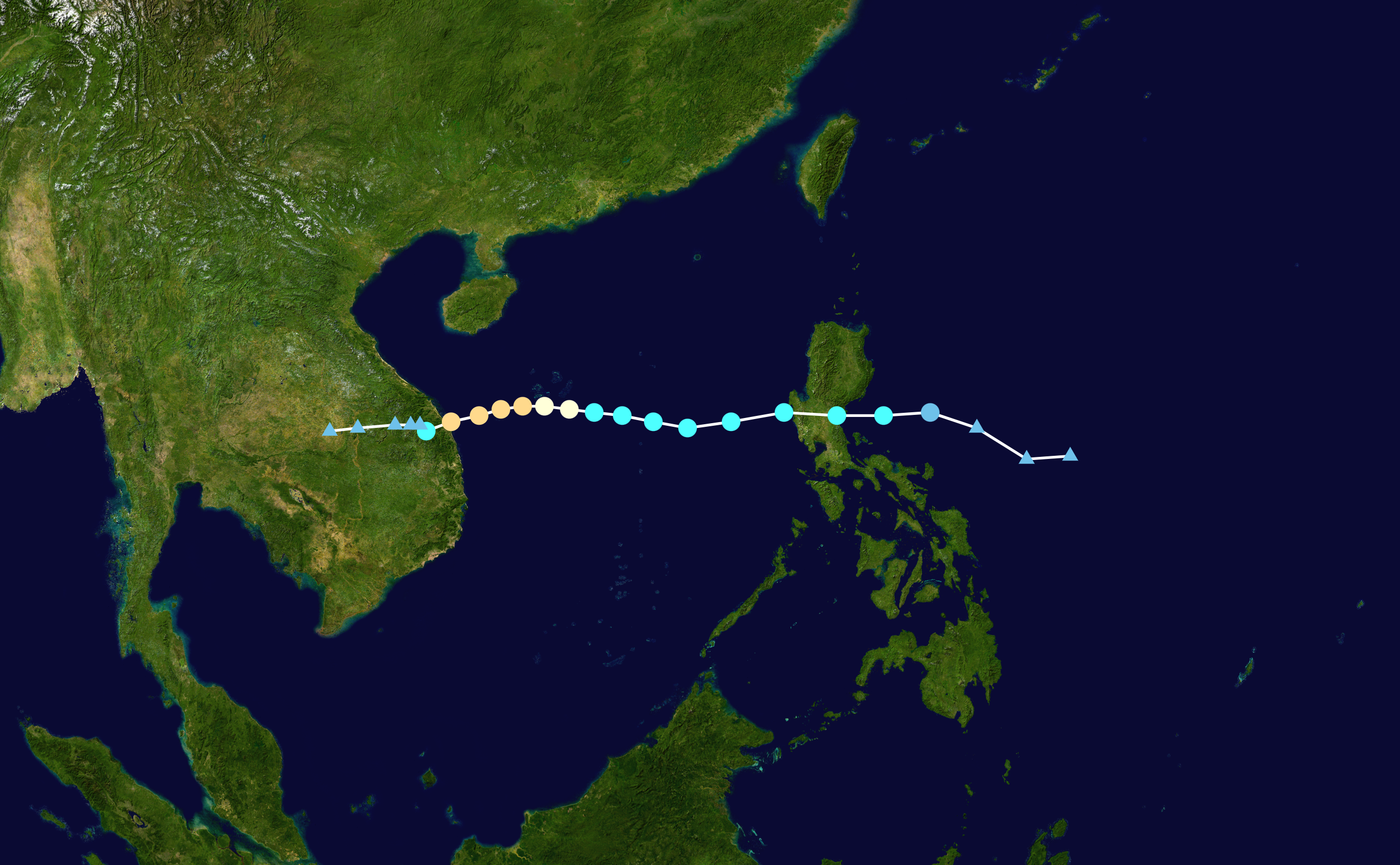
Map plotting the storm's track and intensity, according to the Saffir–Simpson scale Map key Saffir–Simpson scale Tropical depression (≤38 mph, ≤62 km/h) Tropical storm (39–73 mph, 63–118 km/h) Category 1 (74–95 mph, 119–153 km/h) Category 2 (96–110 mph, 154–177 km/h) Category 3 (111–129 mph, 178–208 km/h) Category 4 (130–156 mph, 209–251 km/h) Category 5 (≥157 mph, ≥252 km/h) Unknown Storm type Tropical cyclone Subtropical cyclone Extratropical cyclone, remnant low, tropical disturbance, or monsoon depression

On September 23, 2009, the Japan Meteorological Agency (JMA), reported that a seasonal tropical depression had formed about 860 km (530 mi) to the northwest of Palau. The Joint Typhoon Warning Center (JTWC) then reported later that day that the depression had a developing low-level circulation center and was in a favorable environment with low vertical wind shear. The JMA then reported that the depression had weakened into an area of low pressure. However, early the next day, as deep convection started to consolidate around the low-level circulation center, the Philippine Atmospheric, Geophysical and Astronomical Services Administration (PAGASA) reported that the low-pressure area had become a tropical depression and assigned it a local name of Ondoy. Later that morning, the JTWC issued a Tropical Cyclone Formation Alert as central convection had continued to organize around a consolidating elongated but exposed low-level circulation center. The JMA then re-upgraded Ondoy to a tropical depression later that morning before the JTWC followed suit early on September 25, designating it as Tropical Depression 17W when it was located about 400 nm east of Manila in the Philippines. At this stage, the system was moving along the southern side of the subtropical ridge and had good poleward outflow into a tropical upper tropospheric trough (TUTT) cell.

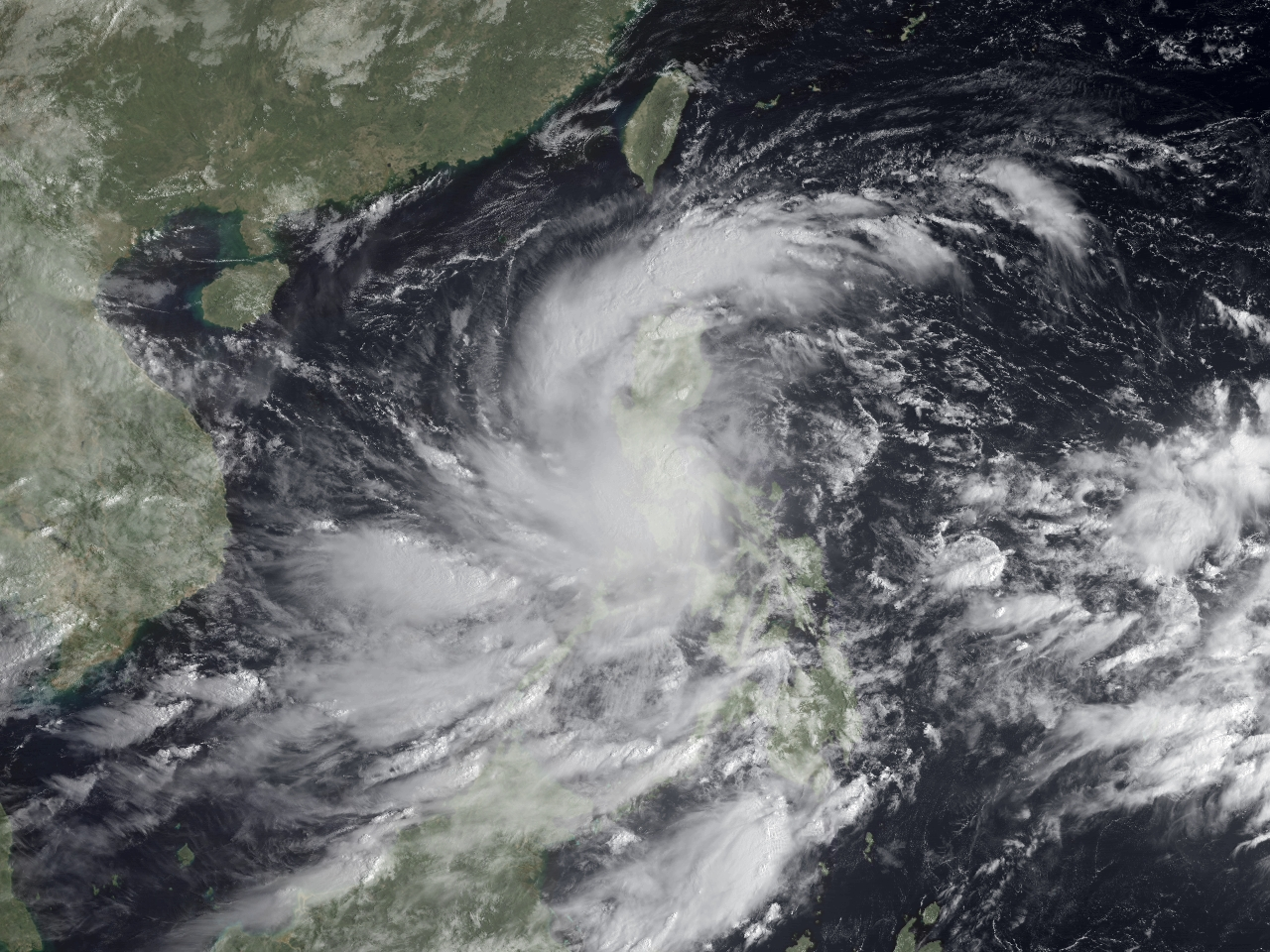
Tropical Storm Ketsana over the Philippines on September 26

Throughout September 25 the intensification of Ondoy was hampered by the system moving into an area of moderate vertical wind shear and by an upper-level trough of pressure that was moving over the system. But later that day the JTWC upgraded it to a tropical storm despite its low level circulation center being partially exposed. The JMA followed suit early the next day, assigning the international name of Ketsana and the international designation of 0916 to the storm. PAGASA then reported that Ketsana had made landfall on Northern Luzon near the boundary of the Philippine provinces of Aurora and Quezon. As a result of making landfall, its low-level circulation center had become fully exposed, but as the storm moved into the South China Sea, it dramatically deepened and expanded while moving west and was upgraded to a severe tropical storm by the JMA early on September 27.

During September 27, Ketsana gradually developed further and was upgraded to a typhoon by the JTWC and the JMA early the next day, as multiple convective bands were continuing to consolidate more tightly around the low-level circulation center, leading to the formation of a disorganized eye. Typhoon Ketsena then intensified quickly under favorable conditions, reaching peak windspeeds later that day of 165 km/h (103 mph) (1-min winds) and 140 km/h (87 mph) (10-min winds) which made it a Category 2 typhoon on the Saffir–Simpson scale. Ketsana then made a second landfall on Quảng Nam in Vietnam, at 0600 UTC on September 29 at its peak intensity. It then rapidly weakened into a Severe Tropical Storm, with the JTWC issuing its last advisory later that day; however, the JMA continued to monitor Ketsana as a Severe Tropical Storm until later that day, when it downgraded it to a Tropical Storm before further downgrading it to a Tropical Depression early the next day when the center of the depression was located over Laos. The JMA monitored the storm as a weak tropical depression until late on September 30, when it released its final advisory.

== Preparations ==
=== Philippines ===
==== Highest Public Storm Warning Signal ====
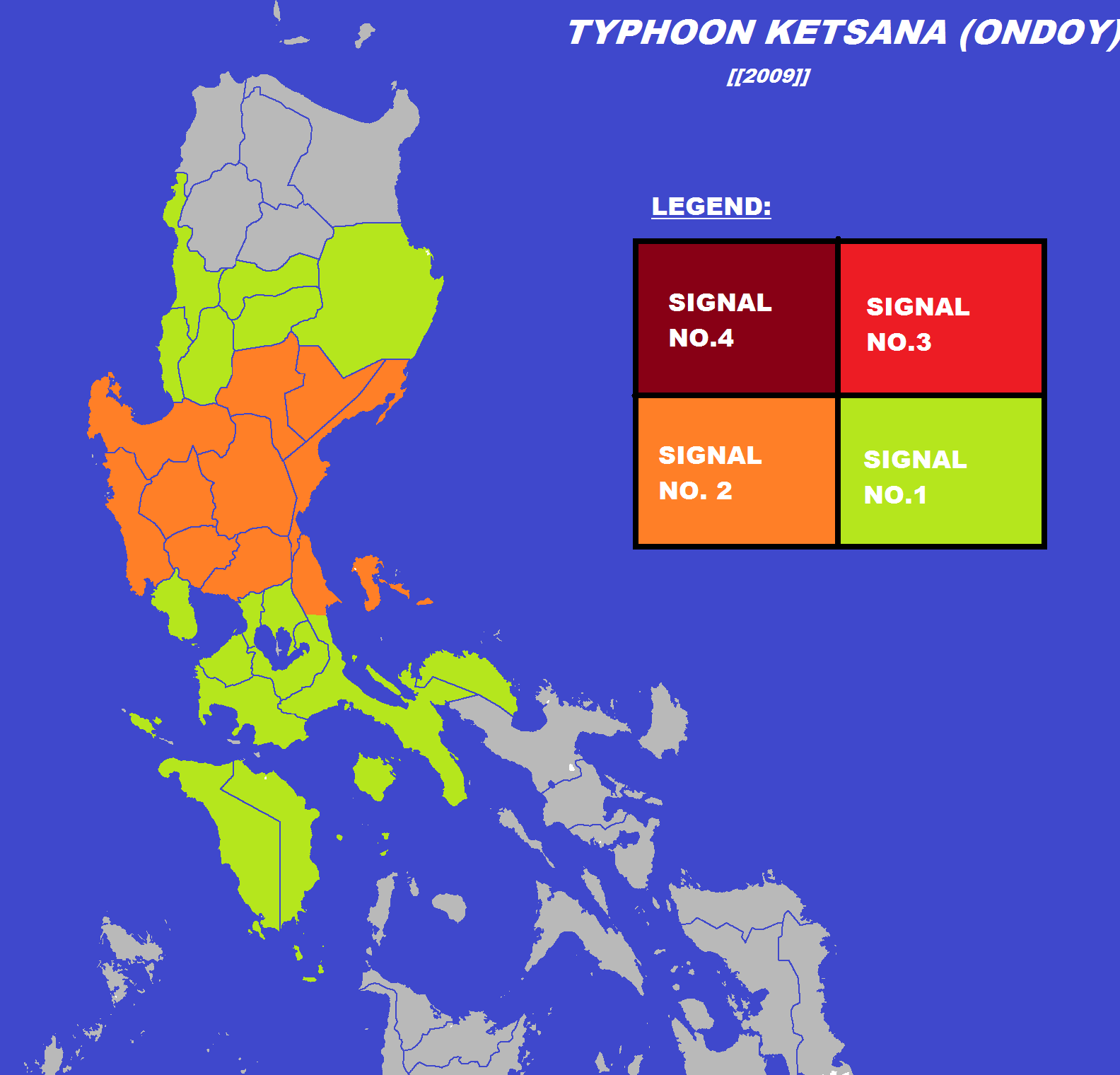
PSWS Map of the Philippines during Ketsana (Ondoy) affecting and striking the Northern Philippines

PSWS#	Luzon	Visayas	Mindanao
2	Pangasinan, Nueva Vizcaya, Quirino, Aurora, Nueva Ecija, Zambales, Tarlac, Pampanga, Bulacan, Northern portion of Quezon including Polillo Island	None	None
1	Metro Manila, Bataan, Rizal, Cavite, Laguna, Batangas, Camarines Norte, Marinduque, Mindoro Provinces, Lubang Island, Ilocos Sur, La Union, Benguet, Isabela, Mt. Province, Ifugao, Southern portion of Quezon	None	None

On September 24, the Philippine Atmospheric, Geophysical and Astronomical Services Administration (PAGASA) placed the provinces of Aurora, northern Quezon, Camarines Norte, Camarines Sur, and Catanduanes under Public Storm Warning Signal (PSWS) No. 1, which meant that winds of 30–60 km/h (19–37 mph) were expected to affect those areas within 36 hours. PAGASA raised PSWS No. 2 for the provinces of Catanduanes, Camarines Norte and Camarines Sur, and Polillo Island in Quezon. On September 28, PAGASA lifted all public storm signals in the country as Ketsana left the Philippine Area of Responsibility (PAR) the same day. After the floods struck, some were critical of the government's failure to predict the scale of the disaster or to lessen the damage it caused.

=== China ===
Late on September 27, both the Hong Kong Observatory and the Macao Meteorological and Geophysical Bureau placed Hong Kong and Macau under the Standby Signal No.1. The Bureau then considered hoisting the Strong Wind Signal 3, but decided it was not needed for Hong Kong, while Macau hoisted it early the next day. These warnings were kept in force until later that day when all warnings were lowered. On September 29 it was announced that parts of southern China would be placed under an orange warning with certain regional meteorological bureaus entering a level 3 emergency response.

=== Vietnam ===
On September 27, the Vietnam National Center for Hydro-Meteorological Forecasting issued a public storm warning signal named "Number 9." The Vietnamese government evacuated some 170,000 people. The government instructed residents to secure their homes with fortified hard wood and sandbag roofs. Also, authorities mobilized several thousand military personnel and police to help residents evacuate from the typhoon's path. Fishing vessels were called to return to their ports. This caused thousands of crops to fail.

== Impact ==
=== Philippines ===
Typhoon Ketsana casualties in the Philippines

NDCC death tally
Region
Deaths
CAR
4
Region III
56
NCR
448
Region IV-A
160
ARMM
3
Total
671

Damages
	Amount
Agriculture	₱6,766,046,143.00 ($143,805,444.06)
Infrastructure	₱4,391,462,577.60 ($93,336,080.29)
Total damages (Note: Total damages figure includes agriculture, infrastructure, casualties, etc. damages.)	₱11,157,508,720.60 ($237,141,524.35)

Tropical Storm Ondoy (Ketsana) Rainfall Distribution over Philippines
Measurement station	Precipitation		Date	Pre-Post(mm)
Measurement station	(mm)	(in)	Date	Pre-Post(mm)
PAGASA Science Garden, Quezon City, NCR	454.9 mm	17.91 inches	September 26, 2009	94.0 mm
Tanay, Rizal, CALABARZON	331.7 mm	13.06 inches	September 26, 2009	41.5 mm
Manila, Metro Manila, NCR	258.6 mm	10.18 inches	September 26, 2009	41.4 mm
Ambulong, Batangas/Laguna, CALABARZON	234.4 mm	9.23 inches	September 26, 2009	49.5 mm
Bagasbas, Daet, Camarines Norte, Bicol	204.5 mm	8.05 inches	September 25, 2009	5.8 mm
Infanta, Quezon, CALABARZON	176.2 mm	6.94 inches	September 26, 2009	98.6 mm
(PSW), Barrio Barretto, Zambales, Central Luzon	159.3 mm	6.27 inches	September 26, 2009	75.2 mm
Subic, W.S., Zambales, Central Luzon	127.8 mm	5.03 inches	September 26, 2009	50.3 mm
Clark AFB, Angeles City, Pampanga, Central Luzon	109.0 mm	4.29 inches	September 26, 2009	25.4 mm
Iba, Zambales, Central Luzon	103.9 mm	4.09 inches	September 26, 2009	39.9 mm

Metro Manila experienced the highest rainfall in history, which brought heavy flooding.

Ketsana caused widespread flash flooding in the cities of Manila, Caloocan, Marikina, Malabon, Muntinlupa, Quezon, Makati, Pasay, Pasig, Taguig, Valenzuela, and San Juan. Flooding also occurred in the nearby provinces of Bulacan, Rizal, Laguna, and other Calabarzon areas. Major roads were rendered impassable because of huge flood currents and clogged cars. Air flights were canceled because of heavy rains.

Earlier, power interruptions were reported in Camarines Norte, and minor landslides occurred in Camarines Sur.

EDSA was closed because of heavy flooding. Defense Secretary and National Disaster Risk Reduction and Management Council (NDCC) chairman Gilbert Teodoro asked the DOTC to keep MRT and LRT lines operational to accommodate stranded passengers.

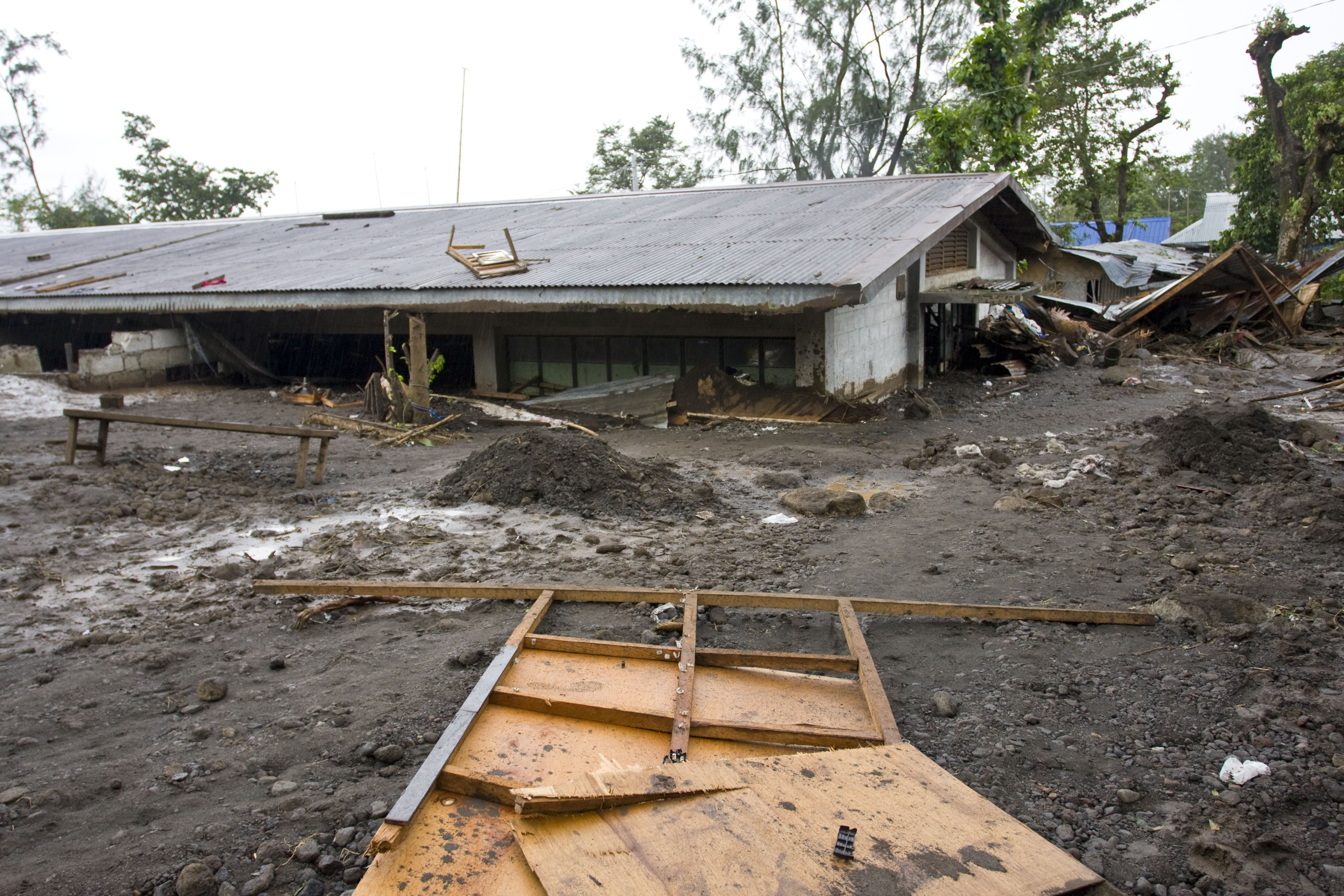
Landslide at Barangay San Juan Bano, Arayat, Pampanga

On the afternoon of September 26, Gilbert Teodoro declared an overall state of calamity in Metro Manila and the nearby 25 provinces in Luzon hit by the typhoon, allowing officials to utilize emergency funds for relief and rescue. Army troops, police, and civilian volunteers were deployed to rescue victims. The Philippine National Red Cross and the Philippine Coast Guard dispatched teams to rescue stranded and trapped people. At that time, the average height of flooding was from two feet to waist high, and in some areas above six feet. Even Malacañang Palace was opened to those who were in need. The landslides and severe flooding left at least 246 people dead and 38 others missing. Public and private roads were clogged by vehicles stuck in floodwater. Thousands of motorists and more than 500 passengers were stranded at the North Luzon Expressway (NLEx). Distress telephone calls and emails from thousands of Metro Manila residents and their worried relatives flooded television and radio stations overnight as most of the power supply, communication, and water supply were lost. Ketsana also caused Ninoy Aquino International Airport (NAIA) to close for almost a day.

The economic region of Metro Manila and many adjoining provinces incurred damages to both infrastructure and agriculture. As of September 28, 2009, total damages from Ketsana were estimated at $100 million. Internet cafés, entertainment plazas, banks, food stores, building agencies, and stores were soaked with water and mud. Many people were warned of leptospirosis.

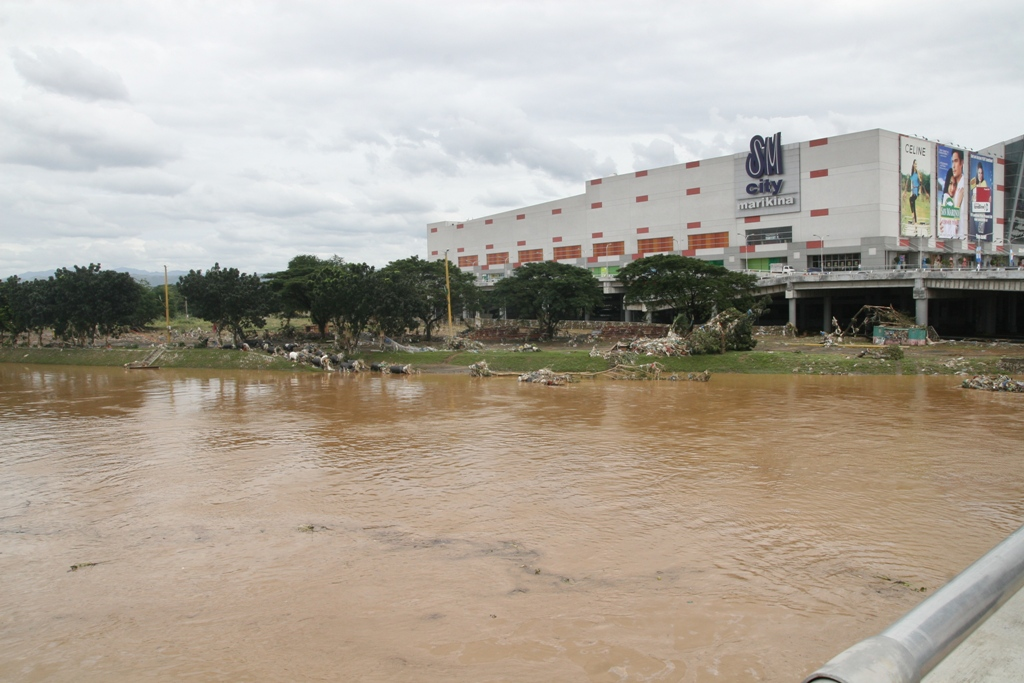
Flooding near the SM City Marikina

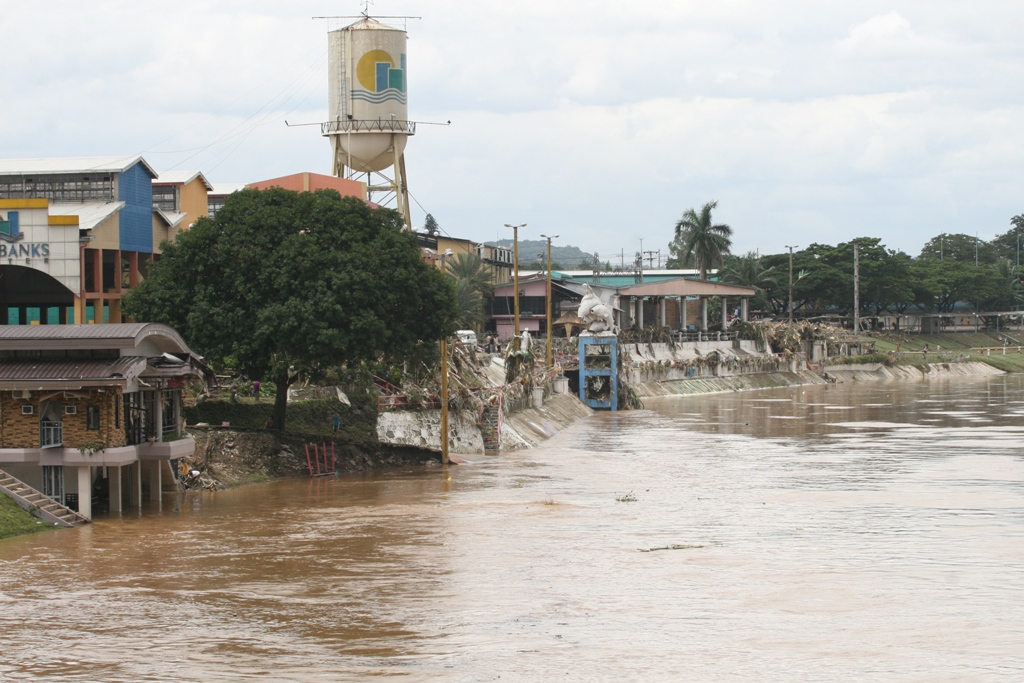
Flooding at Riverbanks Center

Marikina, part of Metro Manila, was the most devastated region in the Philippines: almost all of the city's area was submerged in water up to ten feet deep and tons of knee-deep mud. During the typhoon, the Marikina River broke its banks and transformed streets into rivers. Marikina residential areas, particularly Provident Village, were badly affected by flooding; at least eight people were found dead. Marikina itself recorded 78 deaths, the highest among Metro Manila cities.

At the height of the flooding, around 100,000 liters of bunker oil from the paper manufacturing firm Noah's Paper Mill in Marikina spilled. Most of the oil battered the city's barangays, and a relatively small amount was washed into the basement of the SM City Marikina shopping mall. The spill later complicated rescue efforts in the city. Over two days starting on September 29, the National Power Corporation Flood Forecasting and Warning System released 500 cubic meters per second of stored water from the Angat Dam in Bulacan. The dam had accumulated 100 cubic meters per second when Ketsana hit the province. Mandaluyong also recorded more than 6 feet (1.8 m) of flooding, especially in Gen. Kalentong St., where flooding was more than 10 feet (3.0 m) deep, badly affecting the local campus of Arellano University. The street recorded the highest flooding outside the Marikina area.

In Mindanao, several towns in Cotabato City and nearby Sultan Kudarat municipalities were submerged. The closing of the national highway in Bulalo, Cotabato City led to the isolation of connecting towns for several days.

=== Vietnam ===
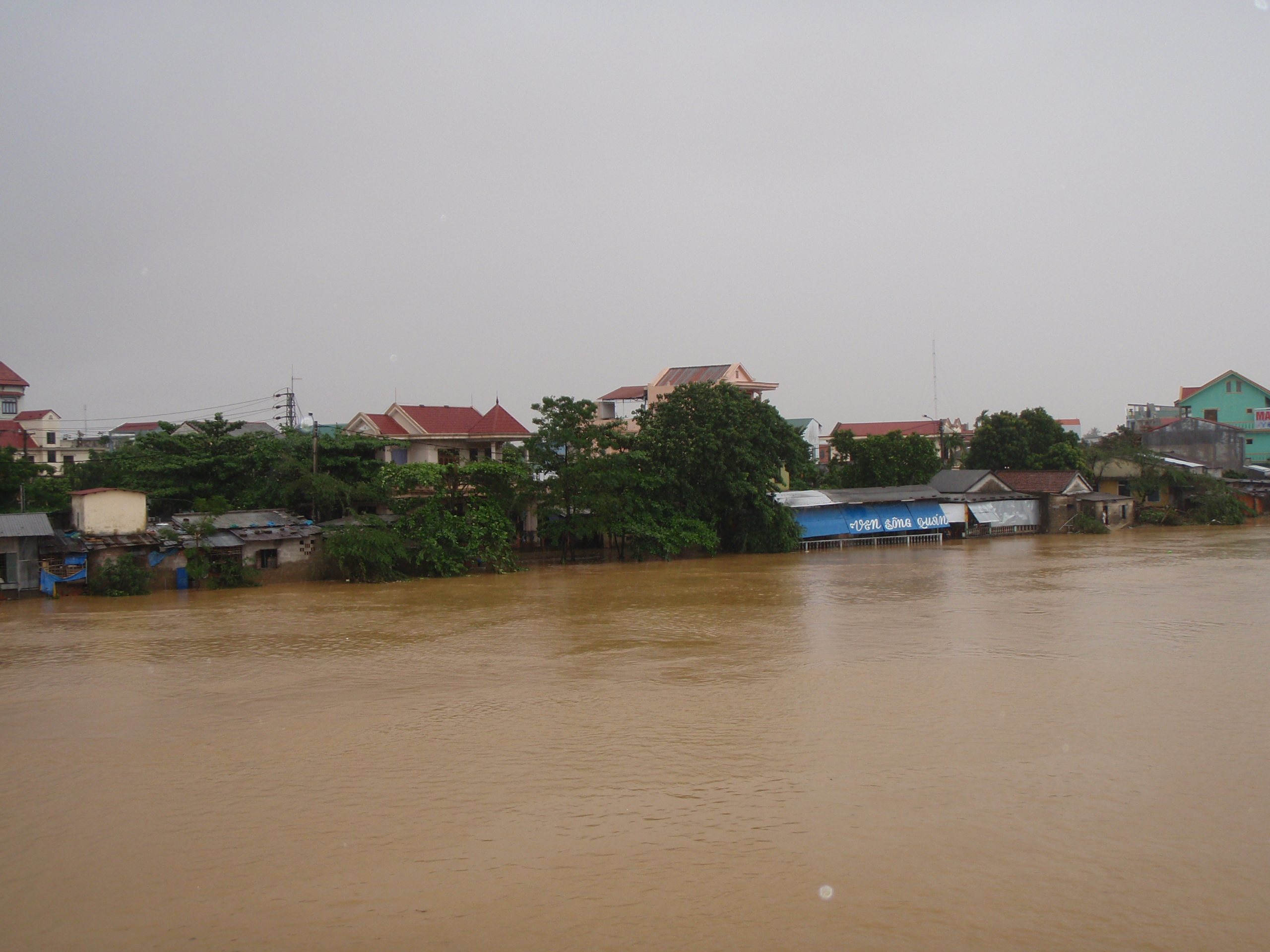
Flooding in Huế, Vietnam, from Typhoon Ketsana

A weather station on Lý Sơn Island near the coast of Vietnam recorded sustained winds of 115 km/h (72 mph), with gusts up to 155 km/h (96 mph). On the mainland of Vietnam, only one weather station in Da Nang recorded sustained tropical storm-force winds, with sustained winds of 79 km/h (49 mph) and gusts of 108 km/h (67 mph). Other stations reported sustained winds below tropical storm-force level.

Costliest tropical cyclones in Vietnam
Rank	Storm	Season	Damage		Ref.
Rank	Storm	Season	VND	USD	Ref.
1	Yagi	2024	84.5 trillion	$3.47 billion	
2	Bualoi	2025	23.9 trillion	$950 million	
3	Damrey	2017	22.7 trillion	$1 billion	
4	Matmo	2025	21 trillion	$837 million	
5	Doksuri	2017	18.4 trillion	$809 million	
6	Ketsana	2009	16.1 trillion	$896 million	
7	Wutip	2013	13.6 trillion	$648 million	
8	Molave	2020	13.3 trillion	$573 million	
9	TD 23W	2017	13.1 trillion	$579 million	
10	Kalmaegi	2025	13.1 trillion	$521 million	

The rainfall in the area from Thua Thien-Hue to Quang Ngai from September 28 to September 30 ranged from 400 mm to 600 mm. Some places recorded more than 600 mm, such as Nam Đông (Thừa Thiên Huế) with 884 mm and Trà Bồng (Quảng Ngãi) with 1,948 mm.

Airports, schools, communications, and electricity in the affected area were shut down. Strong winds also destroyed parts of the north–south high voltage powerline, the backbone of Vietnam's electricity grid. In total the typhoon killed 179 people in Vietnam, 23 during the first hours after landfall; 8 people were missing and 1,140 injured. Total economic losses caused by Ketsana were 16.07 trillion VND (US$896.1 million). (Note: 2009 statistics)

=== Cambodia ===
The weakening typhoon struck northeastern Cambodia as one of the most severe storms ever to lash the country, with the worst damage in Kampong Thom Province in central Cambodia. Death tolls reached 43 people. More than 66,000 families were forced from their homes by floodwaters.

=== Laos ===
There was major flooding in the southern and central provinces of Laos, and much of the country experienced heavy rain and light flooding. Water was up to knee height in the province of Saravane, and at least 26 people died. The cities of Savannakhet and Pakse were worst affected since they were directly on the pathway of the typhoon and directly on the Mekong River. In the Si Phan Don area in Champassak Province, some people took refugee on the roofs of their houses. The floods devastated rice fields and homes. Attapeu was the worst hit province, with nearly 90% of the province affected.

=== Thailand ===
As the weakening Ketsana moved through the country, widespread heavy rainfall and flash flooding were reported in 40 provinces. The heavy rainfall also helped to fill up natural reservoirs within the country. The depression partially damaged 4680 houses and destroyed 44, as well as 820,000 acres (330,000 ha) of agricultural land. Ketsana also injured one person and killed two before moving out of the country as an area of low pressure and dissipating on October 3 over the Andaman Sea. Total damages were estimated at just over $20,000,000. Three dams in Chai-ya-poom were damaged by the heavy rainfall, while in Pattaya nine boats were sunk waves reported to be over two metres high.

== Aftermath ==
State of Calamity declared State of Calamity declared together with confirmed deaths.

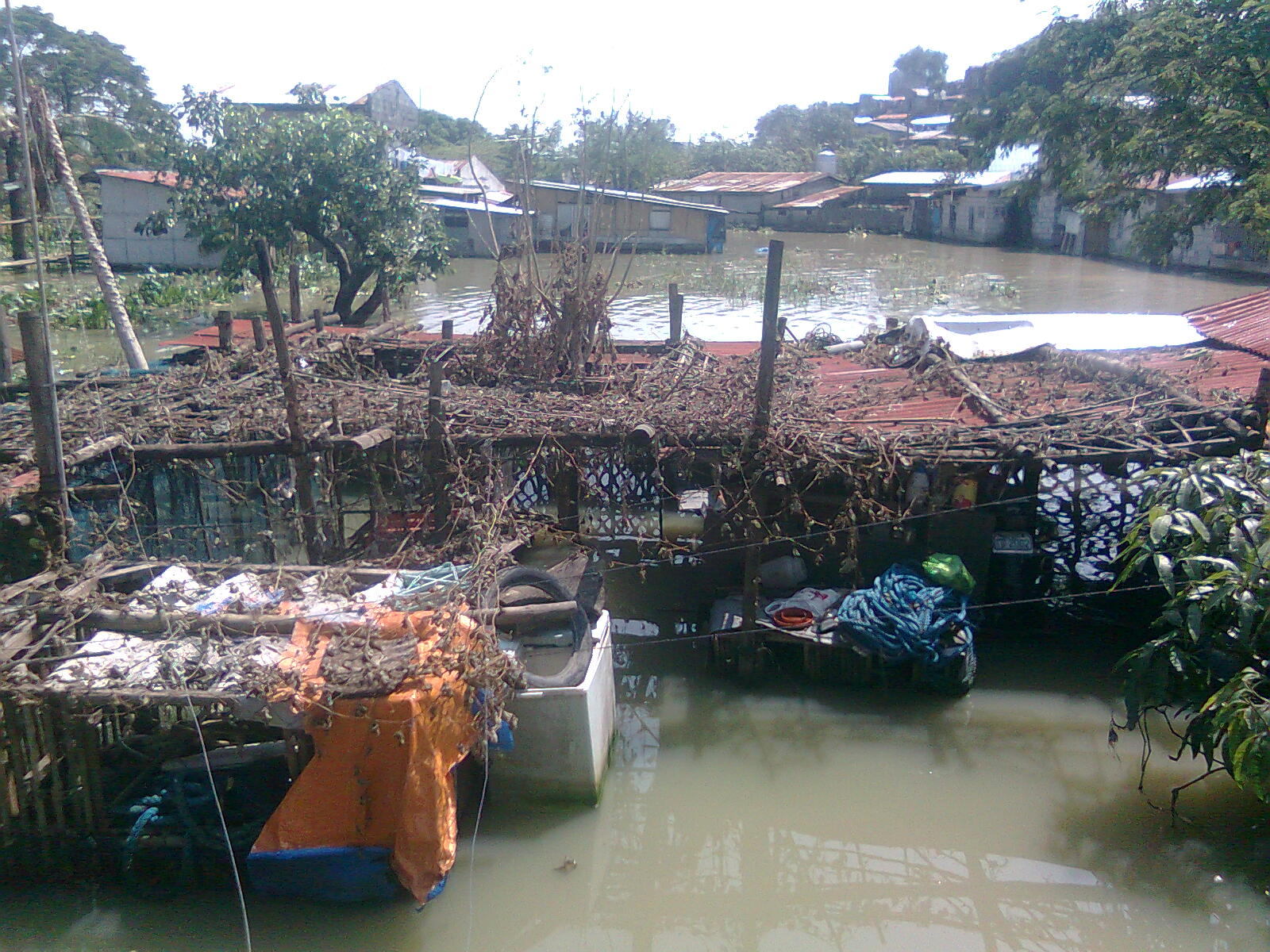
A small plantation in the Philippines flooded by the typhoon.

The Philippine Atmospheric, Geophysical and Astronomical Services Administration (PAGASA) documented a record-high amount of rainfall in 24 hours at 455 millimetres (17.9 in). They also reported that Ketsana's rainfall was recorded from 8 am PST/ 0000 (UTC) of Saturday (September 26) to 8 am PST/ 0000 (UTC) of Sunday (September 27). The amount of rainfall recorded for six hours, which was 341.3 millimetres (13.44 in), was comparable to the 24-hour rainfall in 1967. The damage to property was estimated to be P6 billion, including P4.1 billion in damage to infrastructure, P1.9 billion in damage to schools, and P882.525 million in damage to agriculture.

According to the Bureau of Agricultural Statistics of the Department of Agriculture (DA), an estimated 126,721 hectares of rice-farming land were destroyed, which would affect almost 3% of the country's annual expected rice production. Added to this, Ketsana devastated some 1,374 hectares of corn plantations.

Some 48 hours after Ketsana struck Metro Manila, the Philippine government appealed to the international community and the United Nations for help. Various United Nations agencies, the United States, the People's Republic of China, and Japan provided emergency assistance to typhoon victims in the Philippines. The United States donated $50,000, while China and Japan gave $10,000 and $20,000 respectively. Australia provided A$1 million, and Thailand also provided humanitarian services. Germany donated €500,000, and Taiwan donated $50,000. The United States also deployed Marines to help rescue victims in the Cainta and Pasig areas, as well as for search and retrieval operations for dead bodies. Special Forces Operators and other U.S. service members attached to Joint Special Operations Task Force Philippines also assisted in aid efforts. An additional 3,000 U.S. troops were expected to arrive to assist in relief efforts. U.S. Nonprofit international disaster relief organization AmeriCares shipped $3.2 million of medical aid for Ketsana survivors. An Israeli search and rescue party, doctors, nurses, and paramedics were sent to the Philippines.

In the Philippines, the National Disaster Coordinating Council (NDCC) headed the rescue and relief operations for the citizens affected by Ketsana's flooding. There was also a counterpart private-sector effort among companies and NGOs to provide and coordinate relief activities in various areas.

The Philippine Army deployed about 1,000 soldiers in Metro Manila and surrounding provinces to help in operations. The Philippine Red Cross and the Philippine Coast Guard also deployed teams in rubber boats to rescue people stranded in their homes. On the Internet, citizens turned to social networks like Twitter, Facebook, Plurk, and Multiply to share news updates and forward cries for help from people trapped in the floods. Google Maps was used to pinpoint the locations of stranded people, while various blogs and websites shared information on donating money and in-kind goods. Donations arrived from all over the world and were sorely needed.

After Typhoon Ketsana and Typhoon Parma, the government of Japan gave the Philippines a P1.7-billion (3.350 billion yen) grant to improve the country's weather monitoring and information dissemination system.

=== International Aid to the Philippines ===
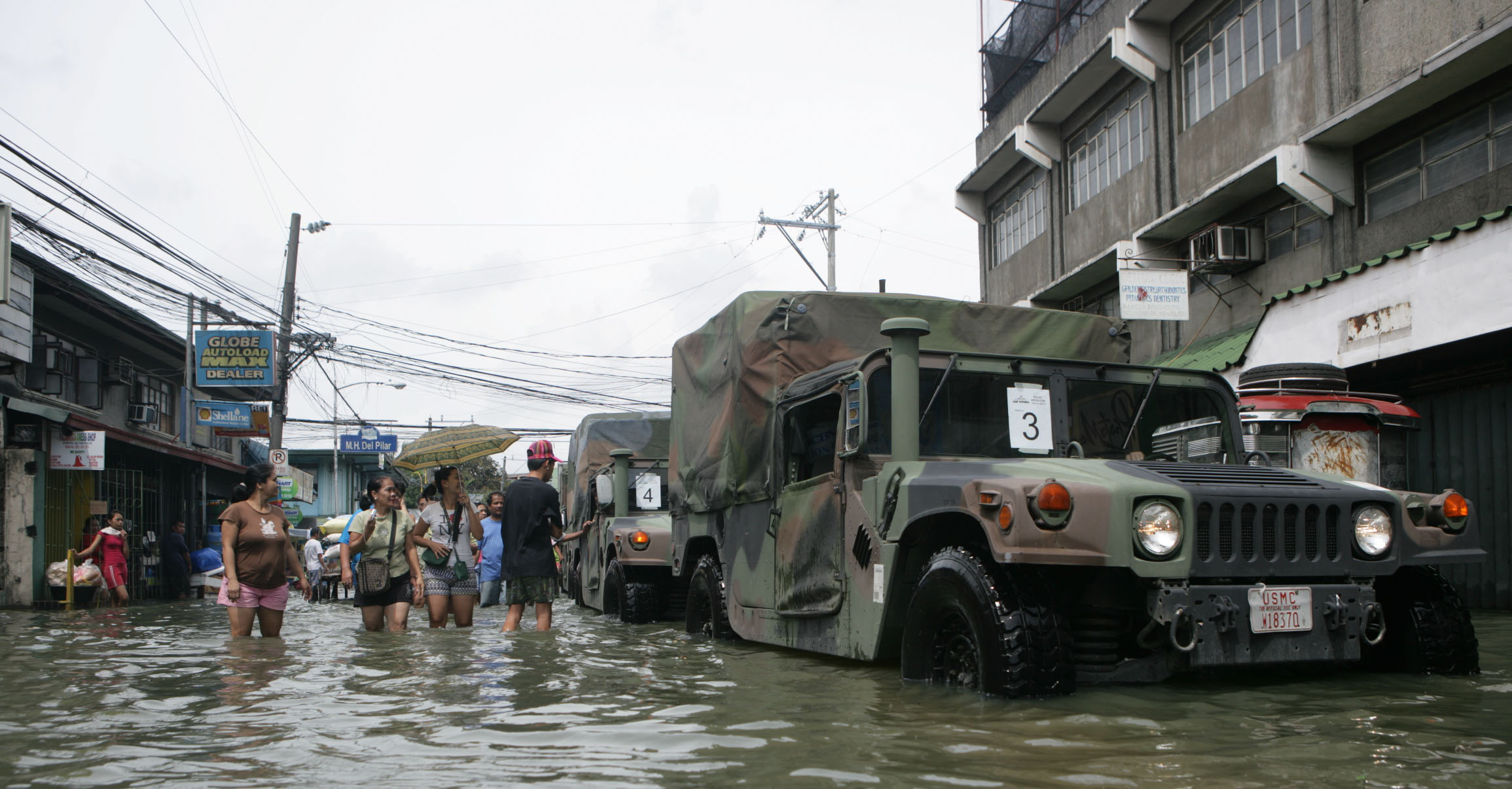
Humvees of the United States Armed Forces deliver family food packs donated by local businesses and private organizations to aid communities affected by Tropical Storm Ketsana.

- Australia: A$11,000,000
- Canada: C$5,100,000, aid packages, water purification systems
  - Canadian federal government: C$5,000,000, priority in visa applications for both temporary and permanent residence
  - Province of Manitoba: C$100,000
- China: $140,000
- Japan: $20,000
- European Union: €2,000,000
- Germany: €500,000
- Israel: medical teams
- Malaysia: 20 tonnes of food aid
- New Zealand: NZ$25,000
- Singapore: $20,000 and 3,200 water purification sets
- South Korea: aid workers
- Taiwan: $50,000
- Thailand: humanitarian services
- United States: $3,250,000
  - U.S. government: $50,000
  - U.S. military: USS Tortuga (LSD-46) and USS Harpers Ferry (LSD-49), 3rd Marine Expeditionary Force plus 20 USMC personnel, a helicopter and four Zodiac inflatable boats.
  - AmeriCares: $3.2 million

== Paracel Islands incident ==
Vietnamese officials and media reported that Chinese naval forces mistreated Vietnamese fishermen who tried to take shelter from the typhoon in the disputed Paracel Islands. The Chinese Navy allegedly fired on Vietnamese fishing boats when they tried to take shelter at Tru Cau island to escape Typhoon Ketsana and after being allowed to stay on the island for several days, they were robbed and beaten by Chinese forces before leaving. Vietnam and China have an agreement that fishermen from either country can ride out storms in the other's territory.

Nguyen Viet Thang, chairman of the Vietnam Fishery Association, said his organization was preparing an official protest to China over the incidents. Colonel Bui Phu Phu, vice chief of the border guard forces of the fishermen's home province of Quảng Ngãi, confirmed the accusations and said the Ministry of Foreign Affairs should send a protest to China.

An official at the Chinese embassy in Hanoi said China had no comment on the accusations.

== Retirement ==
Due to the damage and deaths caused by the storm, the name Ketsana was later retired by the committee. The name Champi was selected to replace Ketsana on the Western Pacific basin name lists beginning in 2011. It was first used in the 2015 Pacific typhoon season.

In June 2012, PAGASA retired the name Ondoy from their naming lists and replaced it with Odette. It was first used in the 2013 Pacific typhoon season.

== Removal of Prisco Nilo ==
When President Benigno Aquino III took office in June 2010, PAGASA Chief Administrator Prisco Nilo was fired and removed from his post on August 6. The agency accused Nilo of having a supposedly fool-proof forecast of Typhoon Ketsana as the typhoon struck over Metro Manila. Aquino adds lack of disaster preparedness and slow installation of Doppler weather radar and other equipment, and slow voluntary response that left the agency unmodernized.

Nilo left PAGASA after Graciano Yumul Jr., took Nilo's vacant seat. This similar accusation also happened on the aftermath of Typhoon Conson (Basyang) in July 2010. Nilo was in Australia for his new post as weather forecaster of the Bureau of Meteorology (BOM).

== See also ==
- List of Philippine typhoons (2000–present)
- Typhoons in Vietnam
