= List of named storms (O) =

Storms are named for historical reasons to avoid confusion when communicating with the public, as more than one storm can exist at a time. Names are drawn in order from predetermined lists. For tropical cyclones, names are assigned when a system has one-, three-, or ten-minute winds of more than 65 km/h (40 mph). Standards, however, vary from basin to basin. For example, some tropical depressions are named in the Western Pacific, while within the Australian and Southern Pacific regions, the naming of tropical cyclones are delayed until they have gale-force winds occurring more than halfway around the storm center.

This list covers the letter O.

== Storms ==
Note: † indicates the name was retired after that usage in the respective basin.

- Obet

- 2022 – tropical depression that minimally affected the Philippines and Taiwan.
- 2026 – a Category 4 typhoon that made landfall in the China which was one of the longest-lived typhoons on record.

- Octave

- 1983 – considered the worst tropical cyclone in the history of Arizona, whose remnants caused devastating and record-breaking flooding in the state.
- 1989 – a Category 4 hurricane whose remnants brought notable rainfall to Southern California.
- 2001 – a category 1 hurricane, never threatened land.
- 2013 – a powerful tropical storm that made landfall in Baja California in October 2013.
- 2019 – never threatened land.
- 2025 – a Category 1 hurricane that stayed out to sea.

- Odalys

- 2020 – a late-season weak tropical storm that stayed at sea.
- 2026 – a Category 4 hurricane that did not threaten land.

- Odessa

- 1964 – never threatened land.
- 1982 – never threatened land.
- 1985 – a category 2 typhoon that hit Japan.
- 1988 – never threatened land.

- Odette

- 1971 – a rare off-season tropical storm in the South-West Indian Ocean.
- 1985 – formed off the coast of Queensland and moved across the Coral Sea.
- 2003 – an off-season storm that formed near the coast of Panama and made landfall in the Dominican Republic.
- 2007 – formed in the Coral Sea, causing heavy swell along the coast of Queensland.
- 2013 – a Category 4-equivalent super typhoon that affected parts of the Philippines, Taiwan, and China.
- 2017 – a category 2 typhoon that affected the northern part of the Philippines and later hit southern China.
- 2021 (April) – formed off the coast of Western Australia and was soon fully absorbed into the circulation of Cyclone Seroja.
- 2021 (September) – a weak short-lived storm that formed off the Mid-Atlantic U.S. coast and moved out to sea.
- 2021 (December)† – a Category 5-equivalent super typhoon that caused severe and widespread damage in the Southern Philippines.

- Odile

- 1984 – a Category 2 hurricane that made landfall northwest of Zihuatanejo and killed 21 people.
- 1990 – a powerful Category 4 hurricane that did not threaten land.
- 1994 – a powerful Category 3 tropical cyclone that did not threaten land.
- 2008 – a tropical storm that affected Central America and Mexico.
- 2014† – a devastating Category 4 hurricane that struck the Baja California Peninsula and also affected parts of Northwest Mexico and the Southwestern United States.

- Ofa

- 1979 – a Category 2 tropical cyclone stayed at sea.
- 1990† – a powerful tropical cyclone that caused severe damage in Polynesia

- Ofel

- 2004 – a weak tropical storm that hit eastern China.
- 2008 – the most intense tropical cyclone in the Northwest Pacific Ocean during the 2000.
- 2012 – a powerful, late-forming typhoon that devastated the Philippines with tropical storm strength, and battered Northern Vietnam with hurricane-force winds at landfall.
- 2020 – tropical depression that affected the Philippines and Vietnam.
- 2024† – a Category 4 super typhoon that struck the Philippines and Taiwan.

- Ofelia

- 1990 – the first of two typhoons in 1990 to directly affect the Philippines within a week.
- 1993 – an early-season tropical cyclone that passed south Japan.

- Ogden

- 1981 – a Category 1 typhoon that made landfall Japan and South Korea.
- 1984 – a Category 1 typhoon that had no effect on land.
- 1987 – a tropical depression that made landfall in the Vietnam.

- Ogni (2006) – throughout Andhra Pradesh, Ogni killed 24 people, mostly on rice or shrimp farms damage totaled $47 million.
- Oka (1987) – a tropical storm stayed at sea.
- Olaf

- 1985 – never threatened land.
- 1997 – an erratic and long-lived tropical cyclone that brought heavy rainfall to regions of Mexico, which would be devastated by Hurricane Pauline a week later.
- 2003 – a minimal hurricane that made landfall in Mexico as a tropical storm.
- 2005† – a powerful Category 5 cyclone that caused severe damage in both Samoa and American Samoa.
- 2009 – approached Baja California.
- 2015 – a Category 4 major hurricane that moved into the Central Pacific and then back into the Eastern Pacific while still tropical.
- 2021 – a Category 2 Pacific hurricane that struck the Baja California Peninsula in September 2021.

- Olana (2026) – a short-lived storm in the Central Pacific.
- Olga

- 1948 – a strong tropical storm that formed in the South China Sea.
- 1954 – a category 3 typhoon, never threatened land.
- 1958 – never threatened land.
- 1961 – Category 1 typhoon that hit southern China.
- 1964 – formed and remained in the Gulf of Tonkin.
- 1966 – a weak tropical storm that affected the Philippines.
- 1970 – a powerful tropical cyclone affected Japan.
- 1972 – struck the Marshall Islands and the Northern Marianas, causing minimal damage.
- 1976 – affected the Philippines and Japan.
- 1981 – a powerful tropical cyclone stayed at sea.
- 1999 – killed 106 people in North and South Korea and caused US$657 million in damages.
- 2000 – paralleled the Kimberley and Pilbara coasts.
- 2001 – large Category 1 hurricane that had no effect on land.
- 2007 – off-season storm that killed 40 people, mostly in the Dominican Republic.
- 2010 – crossed the lower Cape York Peninsula and then meandered in the southern Gulf of Carpentaria.
- 2019 – formed in the Gulf of Mexico, then caused severe damage as an extratropical system across the Central United States.
- 2024 – Category 5 severe tropical cyclone that dissipated off the coast of Western Australia.

- Oli

- 1993 – a Category 1 tropical cyclone that made landfall in Fiji.
- 2010† – a Category 4 tropical cyclone that affected French Polynesia.

- Olive

- 1947 – a Category 3 typhoon that had no effect on land.
- 1952 – a Category 5 typhoon that affected Wake Island.
- 1956 – a strong typhoon that struck the Philippines.
- 1960 – a powerful typhoon that struck the Philippines and China.
- 1963 – a Category 4 typhoon that had no effect on land.
- 1965 (March) – didn't affect land.
- 1965 (August) – a Category 5 typhoon that had no effect on land.
- 1968 – did not significantly impact land.
- 1971 – an erratic and slightly long-lived tropical cyclone that impacted Japan and affected Manchuria.
- 1974 – didn't affect land.
- 1978 – a powerful tropical cyclone which affected the Philippines and Taiwan.

- Olivia

- 1967 – struck Baja California.
- 1971 – continuation of Atlantic Hurricane Irene; hit Mexico.
- 1975 – caused heavy damage in Mazatlán.
- 1978 – continuation of Hurricane Greta; struck Mexico.
- 1982 – brought rain to California.
- 1994 – never threatened land.
- 1996† – a powerful tropical cyclone that passing over Barrow Island off the Western Australian northwest coast, and caused major damage on the Pilbara coast, Pannawonica, and Mardie.
- 2000 – never threatened land.
- 2006 – never threatened land.
- 2012 – never threatened land.
- 2018 – made landfall in Hawaii as a tropical storm.

- Olwyn (2015)† –a powerful tropical cyclone that caused extensive damage across the northwestern coast of Western Australia in March 2015.
- Oma

- 2001 – a Category 1 tropical cyclone that never threatened land.
- 2019 – a Category 3 severe tropical cyclone tha impacted Vanuatu, New Caledonia and the Solomon Islands.

- Omais

- 2004 – a weak storm that formed in May of 2004.
- 2010 – recurved out to sea as a tropical storm.
- 2016 – recurved out to sea, later threatening Alaska as an extratropical cyclone
- 2021 – A long-lived tropical cyclone which affected South Korea and the Mariana Islands.

- Omar

- 1992† – a category 4 super typhoon in the Pacific Ocean, struck Guam, Taiwan, and China, causing 2 deaths and about half a billion dollars in damage. The name was retired after the 1992 season, and was replaced with Oscar for the 1995 season.
- 2008 – a category 4 hurricane that grazed the Netherlands Antilles, Puerto Rico, and the Virgin Islands, doing minor to moderate damage and causing 1 indirect death.
- 2020 – minimal tropical storm that caused rip currents and swells in the Carolinas, earliest fifteenth named storm on record in the Atlantic.

- Ompong

- 2006 – wind shear from Typhoon Soulik prevented any intensification.
- 2014 – the most intense tropical cyclone worldwide in 2014, and struck Japan as a large tropical system. It also indirectly affected the Philippines and Taiwan.
- 2018† – a very powerful and catastrophic tropical cyclone that caused extensive damage in Guam, the Philippines and South China in September 2018.

- Ondoy

- 2001 – a weak storm that completed a loop to the east of Samar Island before moving further out to sea.
- 2005 – made landfall in the northern Philippines.
- 2009† – made landfall in the Philippines and causing massive flooding in Metro Manila and other nearby provinces.

- Oniang

- 1963 – a Category 4 typhoon that impacted Taiwan and China causing 239 fatalities with 89 missing.
- 1967 – struck southern China.
- 1971 – made landfall on Vietnam.
- 1975 – had no significant effects on land.
- 1979 – struck Japan.
- 1983 – a Category 1 typhoon that did not significantly impact land.
- 1987 – a Category 2 typhoon that caused 9 deaths and $365.6 million (1987 USD) in damages when it made landfall on Japan.
- 1991 – a Category 3 typhoon that traveled in an erratic path before striking Taiwan and southern China.
- 1995 – made landfall on Vietnam and the Philippines.
- 1999 – a Category 5-equivalent super typhoon that struck Japan, causing 36 deaths and $5.75 billion (1999 USD) in damages.

- Onil (2004) – was the first tropical cyclone to be named in the northern Indian Ocean.
- Onyok

- 2003 – the strongest tropical cyclone to strike the Pearl River delta since Typhoon Hope in 1979.
- 2011 – a powerful and persistent tropical cyclone that affected Japan, including some areas that had been damaged by another typhoon just a few weeks prior.
- 2015 – a weak tropical cyclone that caused only minimal damages in the Philippines.
- 2019 – a moderately strong typhoon that severely affected Taiwan, East China and South Korea.

- Opal

- 1945 – a Category 1 typhoon passed off the coast of Japan.
- 1946 – a Category 3 typhoon that struck the Philippines and South China.
- 1955 – a Category 2 typhoon that made landfall Japan as tropical storm.
- 1959 – a short-lived tropical storm, forming between northeast of Pohnpei and southwest of Ujelang Atoll.
- 1962 – a Category 5 super typhoon that struck Taiwan, China, Korea and Japan.
- 1964 – an intense Category 5-equivalent typhoon that made landfall Philippines.
- 1967 – a Category 5 super typhoon passed near Japan.
- 1970 – a weak tropical storm that minimal affected Philippines.
- 1973 – a Category 1 typhoon that made landfall South Vietnam.
- 1976 – never threatened land.
- 1995† – a Category 4 hurricane that caused severe and extensive damage along the northern Gulf Coast of the United States.
- 1997 – a Category 2 typhoon that made landfall Japan.

- Openg

- 1965 – hit Taiwan as a Category 3-equivalent typhoon.
- 1969 – a typhoon which affected the Philippines, Taiwan and Japan, killing 75; considered by JTWC as merely a high-end tropical storm.
- 1973 – the final named storm of the 1973 season; affected the Philippines.
- 1977 – struck the Philippines before having an erratic track in the South China Sea, resulting to 54 lives lost.
- 1981 – made landfall in Japan, causing widespread damage amounting to $1.03 billion and killing 43 people.
- 1985 – hit Hainan and northern Vietnam at peak intensity, ultimately causing the deaths of 46 individuals.
- 1989 – a powerful typhoon which affected the Philippines, Taiwan and China, claiming 71 lives in total.
- 1993 – mid-season typhoon that impacted Japan and South Korea, resulting to 54 fatalities.
- 1997 – a strong tropical storm which later crossed into the North Indian Ocean after making landfalls in Vietnam and Thailand; considered as the most devastating typhoon to hit southern Vietnam, killing at least 3,111 people, in addition to 164 fatalities in Thailand.

- Ophelia

- 1948 – a weak tropical storm struck southern China
- 1953 – a Category 3 typhoon hit Hong Kong and Vietnam.
- 1958 – a Category 5 typhoon caused widespread damage on several islands of the Western Pacific.
- 1960† – a long-lived Category 4 storm in 1960 that devastated the atoll of Ulithi.
- 1986 – a weak tropical cyclone passed near Cocos Island.
- 1996 – remained far from land.
- 2005 – a slow-moving hurricane that battered the coast of North Carolina.
- 2008 – moved parallel to the coast of Australia.
- 2011 – a powerful Category 4 hurricane that affected Bermuda and Newfoundland (as a post-tropical storm).
- 2017 – a Category 3 hurricane that affected the Azores; after transitioning to an extratropical cyclone, it struck Ireland, Great Britain and Norway.
- 2023 – a tropical storm that formed off the coast of North Carolina and caused flooding along the east coast of the United States.

- Opong (2025)† – a deadly storm that carved a path of destruction over the Philippines and Vietnam.
- Oquira (2020) – a South Atlantic subtropical cyclone off the coast of Rio Grande do Sul.
- Ora

- 1951 – approached the Philippines.
- 1963 –
- 1966 – struck China.
- 1968 – struck the Philippines.
- 1972 – struck the Philippines and China.
- 1975 – struck China.
- 1978 – approached Taiwan.

- Orchid

- 1980 – a deadly typhoon that made landfall in Japan.
- 1983 – a Category 4 typhoon that affected Philippines.
- 1987 – a Category 2 typhoon that caused "extensive damage" on Ulithi Atoll but no deaths were reported.
- 1991 – a long-lived typhoon that brushed Japan.
- 1994 – a Category 4 typhoon that made landfall in Japan.

- Orla

- 1961 – a weak tropical storm that stayed at sea.
- 1968 – never threatened land.

- Orlene

- 1970 – hit eastern Oaxaca, Mexico.
- 1974 – continuation of Atlantic Hurricane Fifi that crossed into the Pacific.
- 1986 – crossed into the Central Pacific a little over 21 hours after formation.
- 1992 – made landfall on the Big Island of Hawaii.
- 2016 – never threatened land.
- 2022 – a powerful category 4 hurricane struck southern Sinaloa.

- Orson

- 1989† – a Category 5 cyclone made landfall near Dampier.
- 1996 – a category 4 typhoon not affect.

- Osai (2024) – a Category 1 tropical cyclone no significant damage was reported.
- Oscar

- 1983† – one of the worst tropical cyclones to affect Fiji.
- 1993 – a weak tropical cyclone moved on a generally west-southwest course parallel to the Kimberley and Pilbara coasts.
- 1995 – a powerful typhoon that affected Japan and killed 8 people and left many other people missing.
- 2004 – a powerful tropical cyclone that did not affect land.
- 2012 – a minimal tropical storm that formed in the open ocean.
- 2018 – a Category 2 hurricane that did not affect land.
- 2024 – unusually small Category 1 hurricane which made landfall in Cuba and in the Lucayan Archipelago.

- Osea

- 1986 – a Category 2 tropical cyclone no significant damage was reported.
- 1997† – a Category 3 severe tropical cyclone brought major damage to some islands in French Polynesia.

- Oswald (2013)† – a tropical cyclone that passed over parts of Queensland and New South Wales, Australia over a number of days, causing widespread impact including severe storms, flooding, and water spouts.
- Otis

- 1981 – a Category 1 hurricane that briefly impacted Mexico as a tropical storm.
- 1987 – a Category 3 hurricane that stayed out to sea, causing no threat to land.
- 2005 – a Category 2 hurricane that nearly threatened Baja California Sur.
- 2017 – a Category 3 hurricane that stayed out to sea, causing no threat to land
- 2023† – a Category 5 hurricane that made landfall near Acapulco, Mexico; the strongest and most damaging hurricane ever recorded along the Pacific coast of North America, and the second-highest rate of intensification on record for the Western Hemisphere.

- Otto

- 1977 – made landfall near Bowen, Queensland storm caused minimal wind damage but caused extensive beach erosion.
- 1998 – struck China.
- 2004 – remained far from land.
- 2010 – brought heavy rain to the northeastern Caribbean before moving out into the Atlantic Ocean.
- 2016† – made landfall in Nicaragua as a Category 3 hurricane, bringing torrential rainfall to Central America; later emerged into the Eastern Pacific Ocean as a tropical storm and then dissipated.

- Owen

- 1979 – a powerful category 3 typhoon made landfall near Osaka.
- 1982 – a category 3 typhoon not affect.
- 1986 – a weak tropical storm, did not make landfall.
- 1989 – did not make landfall.
- 1990 – a powerful Category 5 typhoon that crossed the Marshall Islands and the Caroline Islands in mid to late November and caused extensive damage to many islands.
- 1994 – a powerful tropical storm struck the Philippines.
- 2018 – long-lived and erratic cyclone that affected Queensland.

- Oyang

- 1966 – passed between Taiwan and the Philippines before dissipating near Japan.
- 1970 – affected the Ryukyu Islands.
- 1974 – affected Taiwan and the Ryukyu Islands.
- 1978 – affected the Philippines.
- 1982 – killed five people when it struck Japan.
- 1986 – made landfall on the Philippines and Vietnam, causing 16 deaths.
- 1990 – moved parallel to Japan, causing heavy rains and 4 deaths.
- 1994 – crossed the Korean Peninsula and Japan as a tropical storm.

== See also ==
- Tropical cyclone
- Tropical cyclone naming
- European windstorm names
- Atlantic hurricane season
- List of Pacific hurricane seasons
- South Atlantic tropical cyclone
