= List of storms named Opal =

The name Opal has been used for twelve tropical cyclones worldwide: one in the Atlantic Ocean and eleven in the Western Pacific Ocean.

In the Atlantic:

- Hurricane Opal (1995), a Category 4 hurricane that caused severe and extensive damage along the northern Gulf Coast of the United States

After the 1995 season, name Opal was retired, and replaced with was replaced with Olga.

In the Western Pacific:

- Typhoon Opal (1945), struck Japan
- Typhoon Opal (1946), struck the Philippines
- Typhoon Opal (1955) (T5526), struck Japan
- Tropical Storm Opal (1959) (27W)
- Typhoon Opal (1962) (T6210, 48W), struck Taiwan, China, Korea and Japan (ja)
- Typhoon Opal (Naning) (1964) (T6434, 51W), struck the Philippines
- Typhoon Opal (1967) (T6722, 25W)
- Tropical Storm Opal (1970) (T7024, 26W)
- Typhoon Opal (1973) (T7316, 18W)
- Tropical Storm Opal (1976) (T7625, 26W)
- Typhoon Opal (Kuring) (1997) (T9707, 08W), struck Japan
