= List of storms named Omar =

The name Omar has been used for three tropical cyclones worldwide: two in the Atlantic Ocean and one in the West Pacific Ocean.

In the Atlantic:

- Hurricane Omar (2008) – a Category 4 hurricane that grazed the Netherlands Antilles, Puerto Rico, and the Virgin Islands, doing minor to moderate damage and causing one indirect death.
- Tropical Storm Omar (2020) – minimal tropical storm that caused rip currents and swells in the Carolinas; earliest fifteenth named storm on record in the Atlantic.

In the West Pacific:

- Typhoon Omar (1992) (T9215, 15W, Lusing) – strong Category 4 super typhoon in the Pacific Ocean, struck Guam, Taiwan, and China, causing two deaths and about half a billion dollars in damage.

The name Omar was retired after the 1992 season and was replaced with Oscar.
