= List of storms named Odile =

The name Odile or Odille has been used for five tropical cyclones worldwide.

In the Eastern Pacific:

- Hurricane Odile (1984), a Category 2 hurricane that made landfall northwest of Zihuatanejo and killed 21 people
- Hurricane Odile (1990), a powerful Category 4 hurricane that did not threaten land
- Tropical Storm Odile (2008), a tropical storm that affected Central America and Mexico
- Hurricane Odile (2014), a devastating Category 4 hurricane that struck the Baja California Peninsula and also affected parts of Northwest Mexico and the Southwestern United States

The name Odile was retired from the Eastern Pacific naming lists following the 2014 hurricane season, and replaced with Odalys for the 2020 season.

In the South-West Indian Ocean:

- Cyclone Odille (1994) – a powerful Category 3 tropical cyclone that did not threaten land
