= List of storms named Ophelia =

The names Ophelia and Ofelia have been used for 13 tropical cyclones worldwide. Four were in the Atlantic Ocean, six in the West Pacific Ocean, and three in the Australian region.

In the Atlantic:

- Hurricane Ophelia (2005) – a slow-moving Category 1 hurricane that battered the coast of North Carolina
- Hurricane Ophelia (2011) – a powerful Category 4 hurricane that affected Bermuda and Newfoundland as a post-tropical storm
- Hurricane Ophelia (2017) – a Category 3 hurricane that affected the Azores; after transitioning to an extratropical cyclone, it struck Ireland, Great Britain and Norway
- Tropical Storm Ophelia (2023) – a strong tropical storm that formed off the coast of North Carolina and caused flooding along the east coast of the United States

In the West Pacific:

- Tropical Storm Ophelia (1948) (T4805)
- Typhoon Ophelia (1953), (T5308) – a Category 3 storm
- Typhoon Ophelia (1958) (T5801) – a Category 5 storm
- Typhoon Ophelia (1960) (T6027, 53W) – a long-lived Category 4 storm that devastated the atoll of Ulithi
- Typhoon Ofelia (1990) – the first of two typhoons in 1990 to directly affect the Philippines within a week
- Tropical Storm Ofelia (1993) – an early-season tropical cyclone that passed south of Japan

The variant Ophelia was retired in the West Pacific after the 1960 season.

In the Australian region:

- Cyclone Ophelia (1986) – a weak and brief Category 1 tropical cyclone (Australian scale) near Cocos Island
- Cyclone Ophelia (1996) – a Category 2 tropical cyclone (Australian scale) that took an erratic track between Indonesia and Australia, never a threat to land
- Cyclone Ophelia (2008) – a Category 2 tropical cyclone (Australian scale) that moved parallel to the Western Australian coast

== See also ==
- Typhoon Omelia (1949) – a Pacific typhoon with a similar name
