= List of storms named Oyang =

The name Oyang has been used to name eight tropical cyclones within the Philippine Area of Responsibility by the PAGASA and its predecessor, the Philippine Weather Bureau.

- Tropical Storm Susan (1966) (T6614, 13W, Oyang) – passed between Taiwan and the Philippines before dissipating near Japan.
- Tropical Storm Ellen (1970) (T7014, 15W, Oyang) – affected the Ryukyu Islands.
- Tropical Storm Rose (1974) (T7417, 21W, Oyang) – affected Taiwan and the Ryukyu Islands.
- Tropical Depression Oyang (1978) – affected the Philippines.
- Typhoon Ellis (1982) (T8213, 14W, Oyang) – killed five people when it struck Japan.
- Tropical Storm Dom (1986) (T8619, 16W, Oyang) – made landfall on the Philippines and Vietnam, causing 16 deaths.
- Typhoon Gene (1990) (T9021, 22W, Oyang) – moved parallel to Japan, causing heavy rains and 4 deaths.
- Tropical Storm Brendan (1994) (T9411, 14W, Oyang) – crossed the Korean Peninsula and Japan as a tropical storm.

After the 2000 Pacific typhoon season, the PAGASA revised their naming lists, and the name Oyang was excluded.
