= List of storms named Orlene =

The name Orlene has been used for six tropical cyclones in the Eastern Pacific Ocean:

- Tropical Storm Orlene (1970) – short-lived tropical storm that hit eastern Oaxaca
- Hurricane Orlene (1974) – Category 2 hurricane that made landfall in northwestern Mexico
- Hurricane Orlene (1986) – a Category 1 hurricane that remained far from land
- Hurricane Orlene (1992) – powerful Category 4 hurricane that made landfall on the Big Island of Hawaii as a tropical depression
- Hurricane Orlene (2016) – Category 2 hurricane which formed in the open ocean
- Hurricane Orlene (2022) – low-end Category 4 hurricane that struck southern Sinaloa causing minor damage

== See also ==
- January 31 – February 3, 2021, nor'easter – a nor'easter unofficially known as Winter Storm Orlena, a similar name to Orlene
- List of storms named Arlene – a similar name used in the North Atlantic Ocean
