= List of storms named Ora =

The name Ora has been used for seven tropical cyclones in the West Pacific Ocean:

- Typhoon Ora (1951) (T5113) – approached the Philippines
- Typhoon Ora (1963) (T6321, 39W)
- Typhoon Ora (1966) (T6608, 08W, Loleng) – struck China
- Typhoon Ora (1968) (T6827, 32W, Toyang) – struck the Philippines
- Typhoon Ora (1972) (T7205, 06W, Konsing)- struck the Philippines and China
- Typhoon Ora (1975) (T7504, 06W) – struck China
- Typhoon Ora (1978) (T7824, 25W, Aning) – approached Taiwan

== See also ==
Storms with similar names

- Tropical Storm Oka (1987) – a Central Pacific Ocean tropical storm
- Cyclone Nisha–Orama (1983) – a Category 4 South Pacific Ocean severe tropical cyclone that had two names to mitigate public confusion
- Cyclone Oratia (2000) – a European windstorm that contributed to the Autumn 2000 Western Europe floods
