= List of storms named Ogden =

The name Ogden has been used for three tropical cyclones in the Western Pacific Ocean:

- Tropical Storm Ogden (1981) – struck Japan.
- Typhoon Ogden (1984) – did not affect land.
- Tropical Depression Ogden (1987) – struck Vietnam.
