= List of storms named Oli =

The name Oli has been used for two tropical cyclones in the South Pacific Ocean.

- Cyclone Oli (1993) – made landfall in Fiji.
- Cyclone Oli (2010) – affected French Polynesia.
