= List of storms named Owen =

The name Owen has been used for seven tropical cyclones worldwide.

In the Western Pacific Ocean:

- Typhoon Owen (1979) (T7917, 19W, Rosing)
- Typhoon Owen (1982) (T8224, 26W)
- Tropical Storm Owen (1986) (T8606, 06W, Emang)
- Typhoon Owen (1989) (T8915, 18W)
- Typhoon Owen (1990) (T9028, 30W, Uding)
- Tropical Storm Owen (1994) (T9402, 02W, Bising)

In the Australian region:

- Cyclone Owen (2018) – long-lived and erratic cyclone that affected Queensland
