= List of storms named Osea =

The name Osea has been used for two tropical cyclones in the South Pacific region of the Southern Hemisphere:

- Cyclone Osea (1986) – a Category 2 tropical cyclone no significant damage was reported.
- Cyclone Osea (1997) – a Category 3 severe tropical cyclone brought major damage to some islands in French Polynesia.

The WMO retired the name Osea from use in the South Pacific basin following the 1997–98 cyclone season.
