= List of storms named Ofa =

The name Ofa has been used for two tropical cyclones in the South Pacific Ocean:

- Cyclone Ofa (1979) – a Category 2 tropical cyclone stayed at sea.
- Cyclone Ofa (1990) – a powerful tropical cyclone that caused severe damage in Polynesia

The name Ofa was retired after the 1989–90 season.

== See also ==
- Tropical Storm Oka (1987) – a Central Pacific tropical cyclone with a similar name.
