= List of storms named Otis =

The name Otis was used for five tropical cyclones in the Eastern Pacific Ocean.

- Hurricane Otis (1981) – a Category 1 hurricane that briefly impacted Mexico as a tropical storm
- Hurricane Otis (1987) – a Category 3 hurricane that stayed out to sea, causing no threat to land
- Hurricane Otis (2005) – a Category 2 hurricane that threatened Baja California Sur
- Hurricane Otis (2017) – a Category 3 hurricane that stayed out to sea, causing no threat to land
- Hurricane Otis (2023) – a Category 5 hurricane that made landfall near Acapulco, Mexico; the strongest and most damaging hurricane ever recorded along the Pacific coast of North America

The name Otis was retired after the 2023 Pacific hurricane season, and was replaced with Otilio for the 2029 season.
