= Hurricane Orlene (2022) =

Category 4 Pacific hurricane in 2022

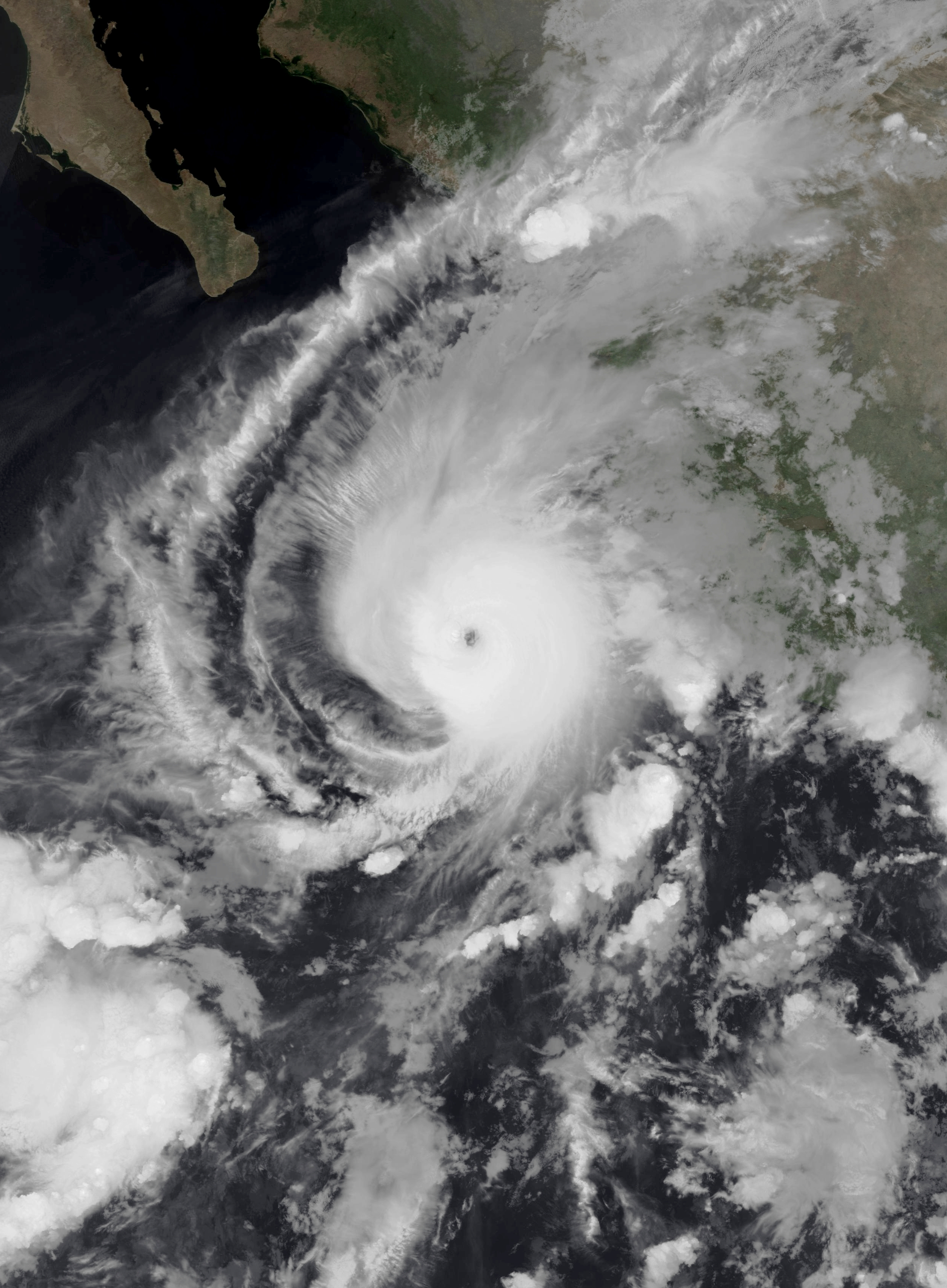
- Hurricane Orlene shortly after peak intensity on October 2

Meteorological history
- Formed: September 28, 2022
- Dissipated: October 3, 2022

Category 4 major hurricane
- 1-minute sustained (SSHWS/NWS)
- Highest winds: 130 mph (215 km/h)
- Highest gusts: 155 mph (250 km/h)
- Lowest pressure: 954 mbar (hPa); 28.17 inHg

Overall effects
- Fatalities: None reported
- Damage: >$600,000 (2022 USD)
- Areas affected: Northwestern Mexico
- IBTrACS /
- Part of the 2022 Pacific hurricane season

Hurricane Orlene was a powerful tropical cyclone that caused minor damage to the Pacific coast of Mexico in October 2022. The cyclone was the sixteenth named storm, ninth hurricane, and third major hurricane of the 2022 Pacific hurricane season. Orlene originated from a low-pressure area that formed early on September 28 off the coast of Mexico, where a small area of concentrated showers improved in organization, forming Orlene. Moving towards the north, Orlene gradually strengthened, becoming a hurricane on October 1 and reaching its peak intensity the following day with winds of 130 mph (215 km/h). Orlene made landfall just north of the Nayarit and Sinaloa border, with winds of 85 mph (140 km/h). Soon afterward, Orlene rapidly weakened and became a tropical depression, eventually dissipating over the Sierra Madre Occidental late on October 4.

Orlene prompted the issuance of hurricane and tropical storm watches and warnings for Northwestern Mexico. The storm's knocked out power to nearly 49,092 customers in two states. Orlene caused minor damage to many schools. Damage in San Blas exceeded MX$12 million (US$600,000), though the total damage in Mexico was unknown.

== Meteorological history ==
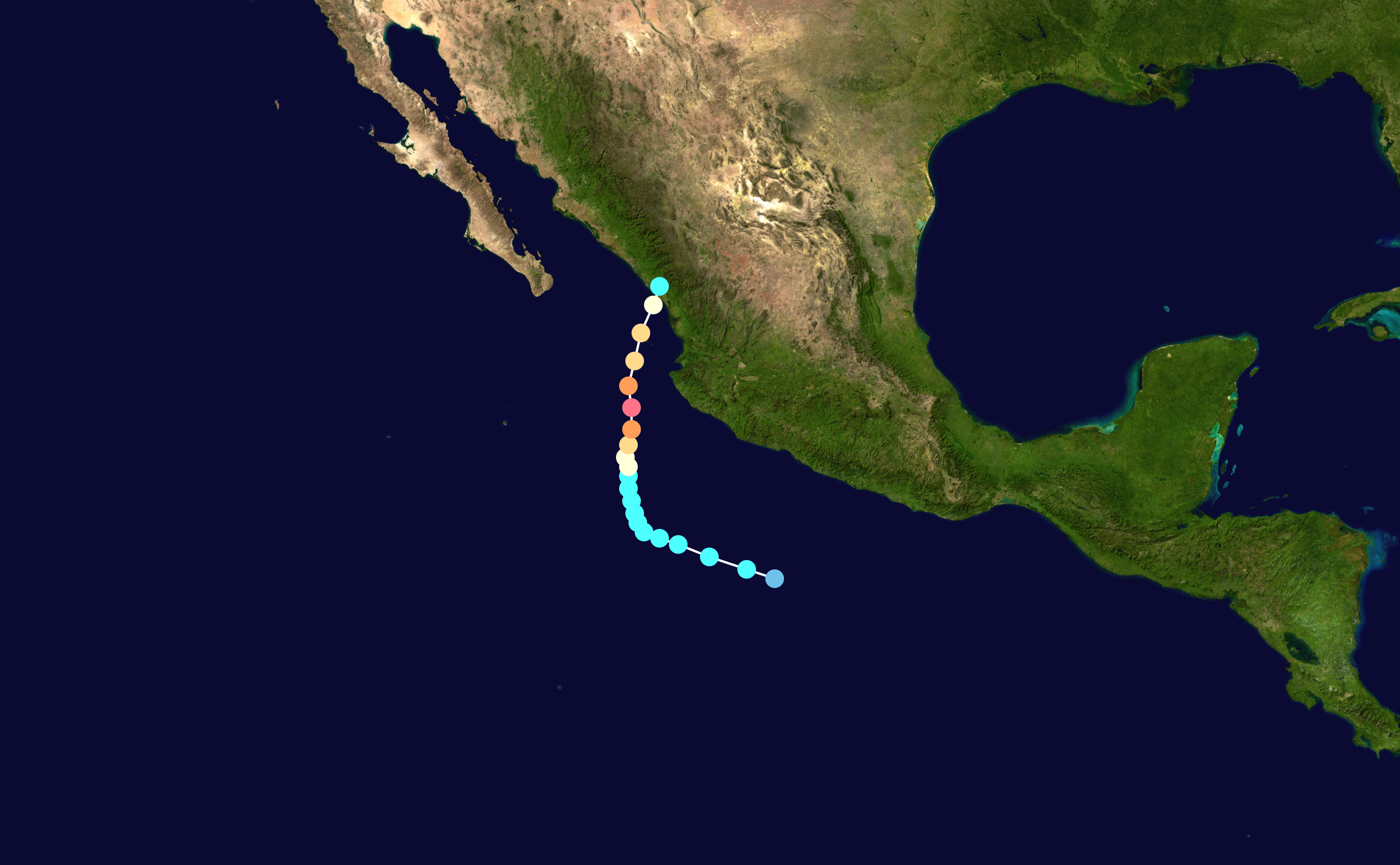
Map plotting the storm's track and intensity, according to the Saffir–Simpson scale Map key Saffir–Simpson scale Tropical depression (≤38 mph, ≤62 km/h) Tropical storm (39–73 mph, 63–118 km/h) Category 1 (74–95 mph, 119–153 km/h) Category 2 (96–110 mph, 154–177 km/h) Category 3 (111–129 mph, 178–208 km/h) Category 4 (130–156 mph, 209–251 km/h) Category 5 (≥157 mph, ≥252 km/h) Unknown Storm type Tropical cyclone Subtropical cyclone Extratropical cyclone, remnant low, tropical disturbance, or monsoon depression

On September 25, the National Hurricane Center (NHC) noted the possible development of a low-pressure area located several miles offshore the south of the Southwestern Mexico coast which was conducive for further tropical cyclogenesis The low produced a large area of disorganized showers and thunderstorms. Satellite imagery showed that the associated shower activity was showing signs of organization. By September 29, the NHC initiated advisories on Tropical Depression Sixteen-E. Six hours later, the depression strengthened into a tropical storm, and was assigned the name Orlene. Orlene become better organized, with a small central dense overcast forming. There was a burst of deep convection and a gradual increase in satellite presentation.

Microwave imagery revealed a well-defined curved band wrapping into a developing inner core. Orlene strengthened into a hurricane at 15:00 UTC on October 1, with central convection becoming more symmetric. An Air Force Reserve reconnaissance aircraft recorded 700 mb flight-level winds of 80 mph (130 km/h) around the northeastern eyewall. Later that day, Orlene intensified, reaching Category 2 hurricane. Strengthening continued as Orlene estimated a well-defined eye with a diameter of 10–15 nmi (19–28 km), and at 06:00 UTC the next day, Orlene became a Category 3 hurricane. Six hours later, Orlene peaked as a Category 4 major hurricane with maximum sustained winds of 130 mph (215 km/h) and a minimum central pressure of 949 mbar (28.02 inHg). Southwestern wind shear began to increase, as the eye had become cloud-filled as a result, the hurricane weakened to Category 3 strength.

The center of the storm, embedded within an area of cloud top temperatures below 70–80 °C (158–176 °F). Orlene weakened to Category 2 strength at 03:00 UTC on October 3. Orlene's cloud pattern became less organized, due to the influence of strong southwesterly shear associated with an upper-level trough near Baja California. Orlene made landfall just north of the Nayarit and Sinaloa border's, weakening to a Category 1 strength by 13:45 UTC. By 18:00 UTC, the storms moved inland and weakened, into a tropical storm. Orlene rapidly weakened, becoming a tropical depression at 21:00 UTC that same day. The system later dissipated over Sierra Madre Occidental late on October 4.

== Preparations and impact ==
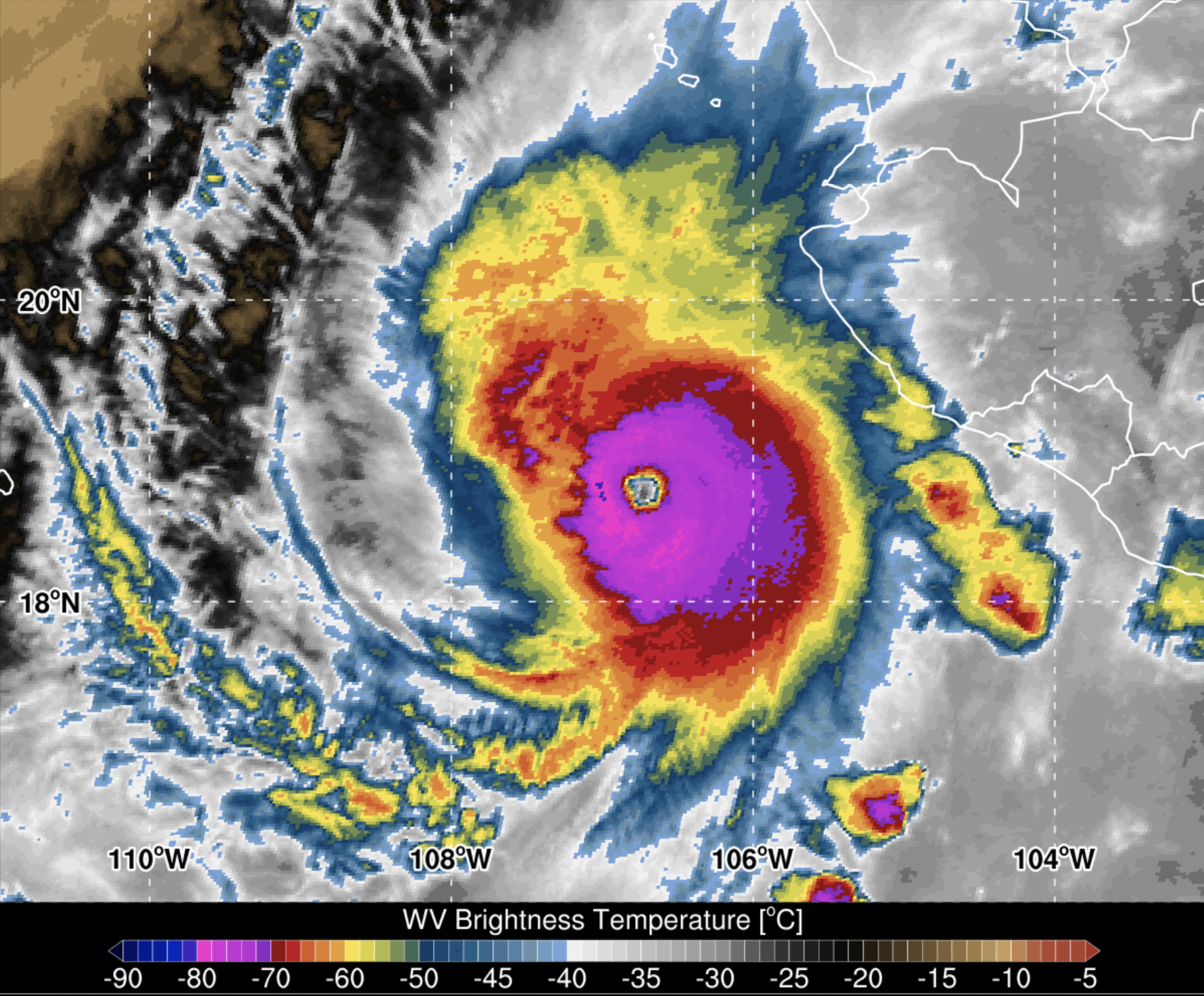
GOES-17 water vapor image of Hurricane Orlene near peak intensity on October 2

The Government of Mexico issued a hurricane warning on September 30 for Islas Marías, with tropical storm watches and warnings posted on the coast of San Blas and Manzanillo. In the state of Sinaloa, emergency shelters were opened. The ports of Manzanillo and Puerto Vallarta were closed. According to the Secretary of Tourism of Mazatlan, Rosario Torres Noriega, flights at the airport were suspended due to the approaching storm. Classes were also suspended in Jalisco. Ten municipalities in Jalisco were placed under a "orange" alert. Red alerts were issued for Sinaloa, and Nayarit. More than 300 operational officers and different dependencies were deployed. The State Civil Protection (UEPC) of the Government of Colima were advised to take necessary precautions.

Orlene brought heavy rains that caused landslide in Durango-Mazatlán Superhighway. Orlene produced large swells, affecting areas from the west coast of Mexico. In the municipality of Escuinapa, heavy winds brought down an electricity tower, causing the area to be left without power. Fallen poles and downed trees were reported throughout El Rosario. Border crossings from the state of Sinaloa into the state of Nayarit were minimalized after Orlene made landfall. Orlene affected families approximately 700 people. 242 schools were impacted, receiving minor damage. In Puerto Vallarta, the hurricane caused widespread flooding in the communities. So far, no victims or significant damage have been reported, according to Nayarit's Secretary of Security, Jorge Rodríguez.

Heavy rains were reported across the Acaponeta. Plan DN-III-E, a disaster relief and rescue plan, was activated in Sinaloa after the passage of Orlene. 80 houses were affected in La Huerta. The Federal Electricity Commission (CFE) were deployed its crews to repair the damage caused by the strong winds. The CFE reported 49,092 customers lost electricity across Sinaloa and Nayarit, due to Orlene. Overall, Orlene left at least MX$12 million (US$600,000) of damage in San Blas.

== See also ==
- Weather of 2022
- Tropical cyclones in 2022
- List of Category 4 Pacific hurricanes
- Other storms of the same name
- Hurricane Patricia — Hit the same areas 7 years before
- Tropical Storm Sonia (2013) — Hit the same areas
- Hurricane Roslyn (2022) — Category 4 hurricane that hit the same areas two weeks later
