= Tropical Storm Olga (2007) =

Atlantic tropical storm in 2007

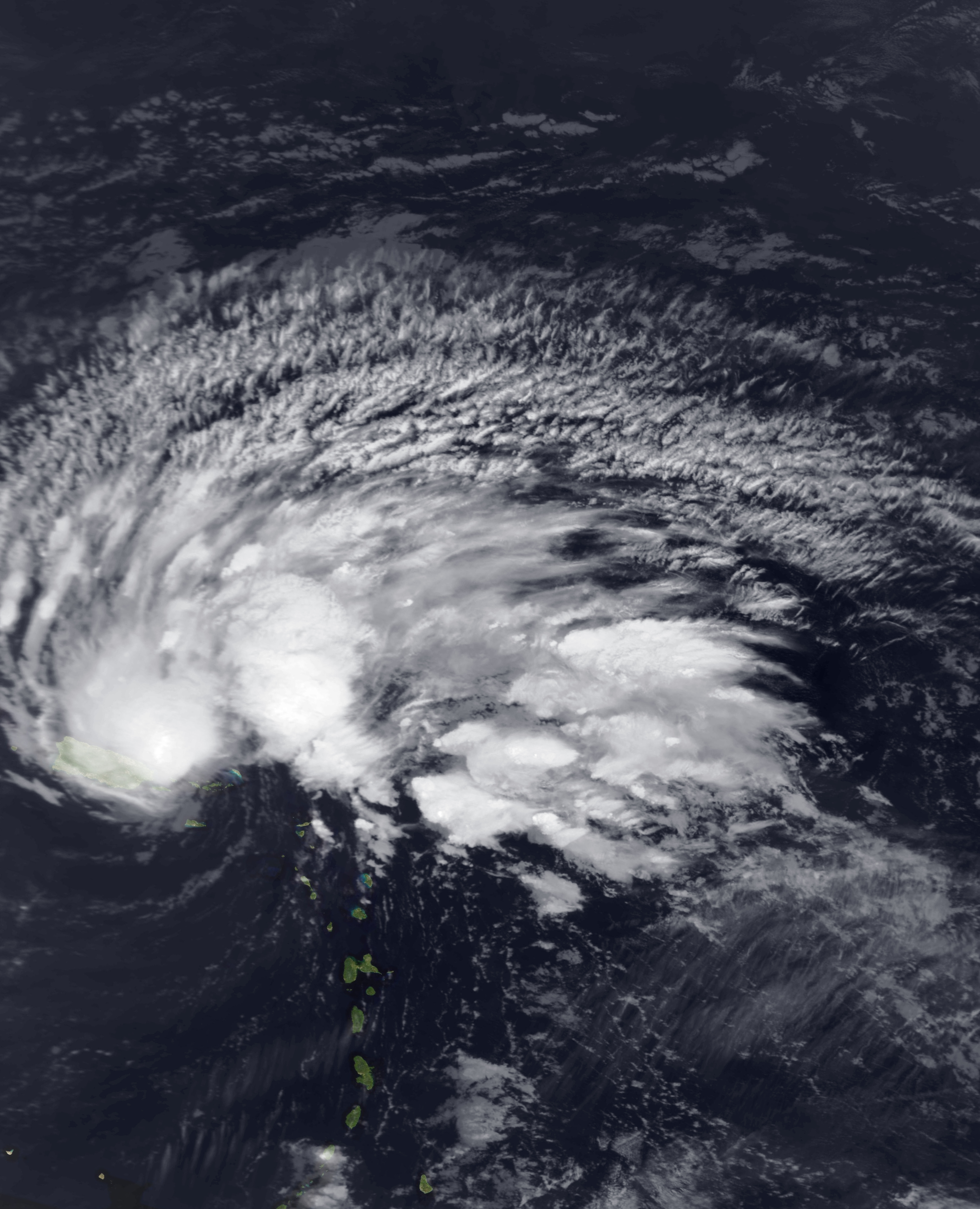
- Subtropical Storm Olga on December 11

Meteorological history
- Formed: December 11, 2007
- Remnant low: December 13, 2007
- Dissipated: December 17, 2007

Tropical storm
- 1-minute sustained (SSHWS/NWS)
- Highest winds: 60 mph (95 km/h)
- Lowest pressure: 1003 mbar (hPa); 29.62 inHg

Overall effects
- Fatalities: 40 direct
- Damage: $45 million (2007 USD)
- Areas affected: Puerto Rico, Hispaniola, Yucatan Peninsula, central Florida
- IBTrACS
- Part of the 2007 Atlantic hurricane season

Tropical Storm Olga was an off-season tropical cyclone that impacted the Greater Antilles. The fifteenth named storm of the 2007 Atlantic hurricane season, Olga developed from a low developed east of the northernmost Lesser Antilles. It slowly acquired tropical characteristics, and late on December 10, the NHC declared it Subtropical Storm Olga while just north of Puerto Rico. It was the first post-season storm since Tropical Storm Zeta in the 2005 season, making the 2007 season one of the few with activity both before and after the official bounds of the hurricane season. Olga was only one of a few out of season tropical cyclones to make landfall. The storm made landfall on December 11 on the eastern tip of the Dominican Republic. Later that evening, Olga transitioned into a tropical storm just after making landfall. Olga tracked over Hispaniola and emerged in the Caribbean Sea. Strong wind shear and dry air caused Olga to weaken into a remnant low early on December 13.

The storm impacted many areas affected by Hurricane Noel a month earlier. Olga killed a total of 40 people throughout its existence – one in Puerto Rico, two in Haiti, and 37 in the Dominican Republic. Twenty of these were caused by the release of floodgates at a dam in Santiago Province.

== Meteorological history ==
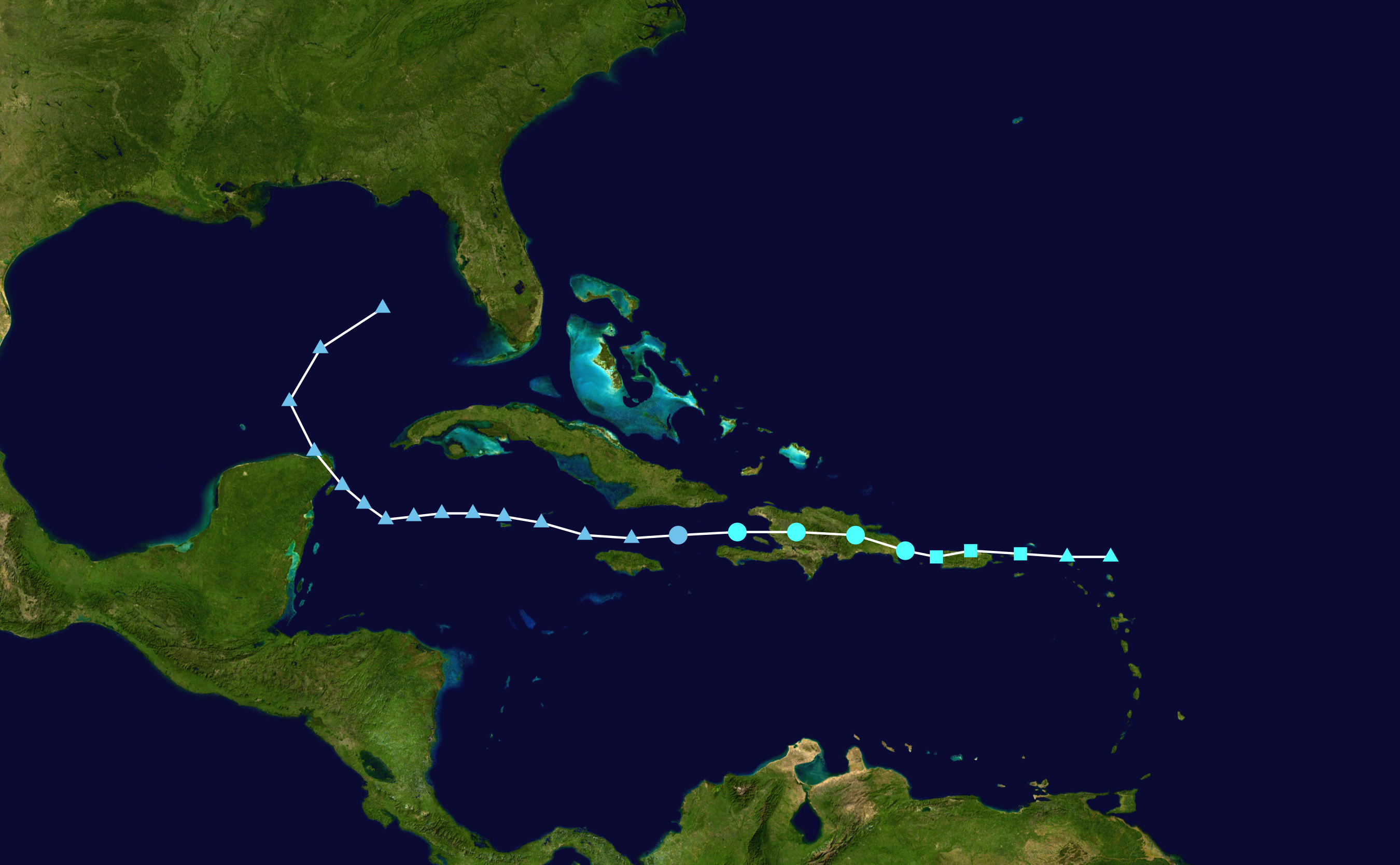
Map plotting the storm's track and intensity, according to the Saffir–Simpson scale Map key Saffir–Simpson scale Tropical depression (≤38 mph, ≤62 km/h) Tropical storm (39–73 mph, 63–118 km/h) Category 1 (74–95 mph, 119–153 km/h) Category 2 (96–110 mph, 154–177 km/h) Category 3 (111–129 mph, 178–208 km/h) Category 4 (130–156 mph, 209–251 km/h) Category 5 (≥157 mph, ≥252 km/h) Unknown Storm type Tropical cyclone Subtropical cyclone Extratropical cyclone, remnant low, tropical disturbance, or monsoon depression

In the first week of December, a westward-moving upper-level low led to the formation of a broad surface trough well to the east of the northern Lesser Antilles. With a strong ridge to its northeast, the trough tracked slowly westward, producing scattered convection and some cyclonic turning. On December 8 convection began to persist in association with the trough and an upper-level low. Early on December 9, officials at the Tropical Prediction Center began classifying the system using the Hebert-Poteat technique, and several tropical cyclone forecast models anticipated its development of tropical characteristics. The system, which consisted of a sharp trough with an area of gale force winds to its north, continued westward through an area of moderately warm sea surface temperatures. On December 10 a low-level circulation developed within the system, though its convection had become disorganized and well-removed from the center. Southerly wind shear left the structure asymmetric, and convection steadily increased closer to the center. With an upper-level low situated just south of the center, the National Hurricane Center classified it as Subtropical Storm Olga at 0300 UTC on December 11 while located about 55 miles (85 km) east of San Juan, Puerto Rico.

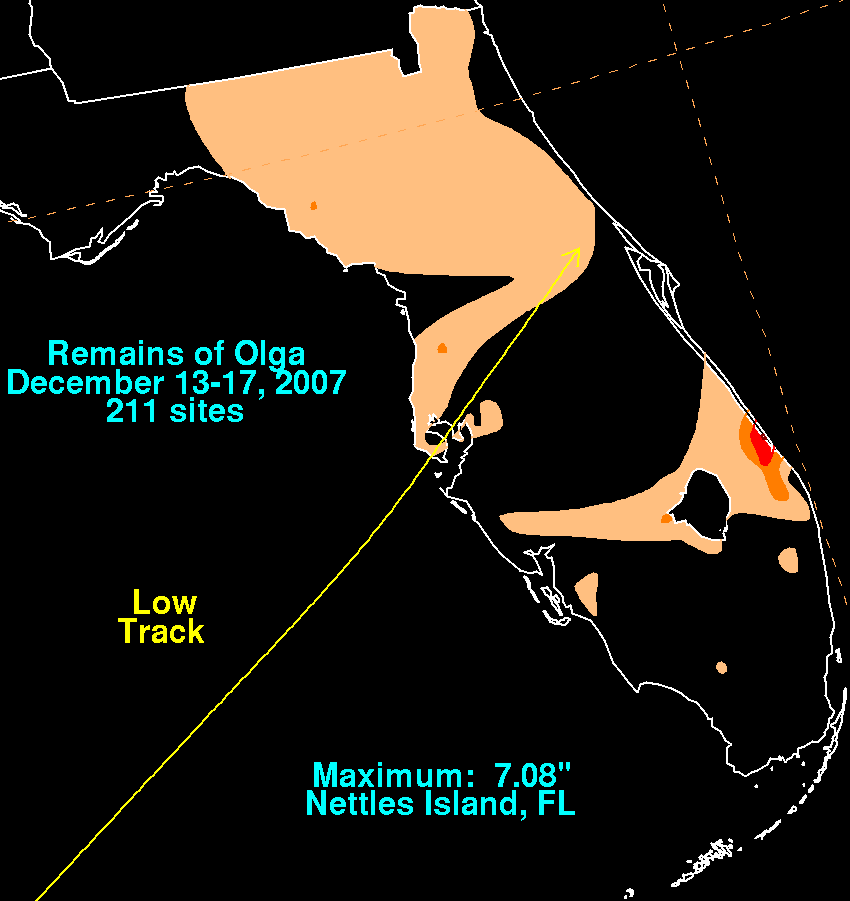
Rainfall caused by Olga's remnant low passing by Florida

Upon being classified as a subtropical cyclone, Olga maintained well-defined outflow, and located to the southeast of a strong ridge over the western Atlantic Ocean, the cyclone tracked west-southwestward. The storm strengthened slightly while paralleling the north coast of Puerto Rico, before later making landfall over the north central coast of Puerto Rico at 0700 UTC on December 11. After an increase in convection near the center, Olga transitioned into a tropical storm and made landfall near Punta Cana, Dominican Republic at 1800 UTC on December 11 at peak intensity. Operationally, it was thought that the storm had transitioned to a tropical cyclone while over land, after a Hurricane Hunters flight into the storm reported a tighter wind gradient and peak winds of 60 mph (95 km/h). Convection rapidly weakened as the storm crossed central Hispaniola, and upon reaching the Caribbean Sea the system lacked the convection required for the classification of a tropical cyclone; rainbands well to its northeast maintained stronger winds, though the center became ill-defined with dry air and strong wind shear. Late on December 12, convection increased slightly over the center, though by that time the cyclone weakened to tropical depression status. As significant convection failed to persist, the National Hurricane Center discontinued advisories on Olga earlier on December 13 while located about 80 miles (130 km) northwest of Kingston.

Its remnants continued west-northwestward with a clear low-level circulation, producing scattered thunderstorms over Cuba and the Cayman Islands with its moisture extending northward into southern Florida. A small cluster of deep convection developed just east of the center, and the low-level circulation remained well-defined as it approached the coast of the Yucatán Peninsula. The remnants of Olga turned northward into the Gulf of Mexico as a cold front approached the center from the northwest. Late on December 16 and early on December 17, the low intensified as it approached the west coast of Florida, with sustained winds of tropical storm force, and gusts to hurricane force, being reported at Clearwater Beach. Ultimately, the approaching cold front absorbed the low as it moved across the Florida peninsula. The cold front was associated with a powerful winter storm that affected much of Eastern America during that weekend and killed at least 25 across six US states and three Canadian provinces tapped Olga's moisture, drawing it northeastward mainly offshore the East Coast.

== Preparations ==
On December 10, the National Hurricane Center issued a gale warning for waters north of the Lesser Antilles, Puerto Rico, and the Dominican Republic, in association with the precursor disturbance to Olga. Upon it being classified as a subtropical cyclone, the government of the Dominican Republic issued a tropical storm warning from Cabo Engaño along the north coast to its border with Haiti; a tropical storm watch was also issued along the southern coastline to near Santo Domingo. Because winds were well to the north of its center, a tropical storm warning was not issued for Puerto Rico. Prior to it moving ashore, the government of Haiti issued a tropical storm warning for its northern coastline, and later a tropical storm warning was issued for the Turks and Caicos Islands, as well as the southeastern Bahamas.

The San Juan National Weather Service office issued a flood watch for all of Puerto Rico, including the islands of Culebra and Vieques. Extended periods of heavy rainfall also resulted in flash flood warnings for portions across the island. Ferry service between Fajardo and the islands of Culebra and Vieques was temporarily suspended during the passage of the storm. In the Dominican Republic, officials opened shelters in 15 provinces, with citizens in low-lying areas recommended to stay elsewhere during the passage of the storm; citizens in 22 communities were evacuated.

== Impact ==
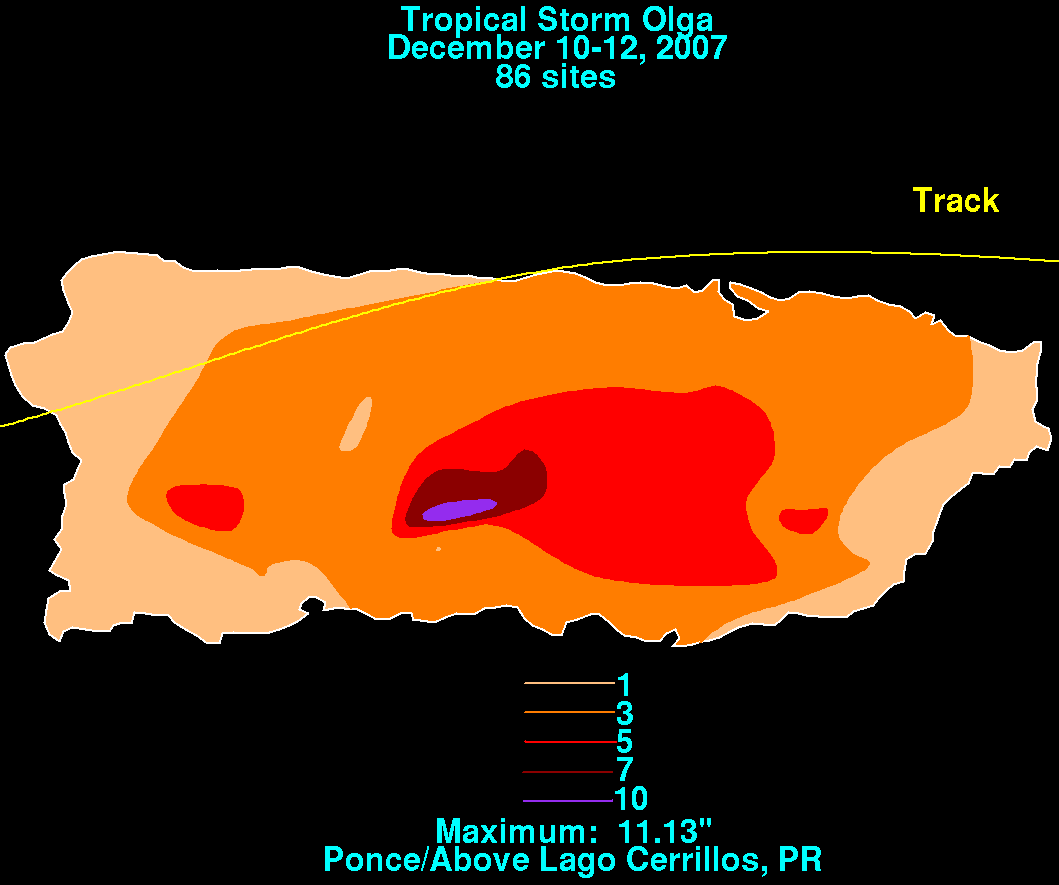
Olga's rainfall in Puerto Rico

The cyclone dropped light to moderate precipitation across Puerto Rico, peaking at 11.13 inches (283 mm) near Ponce. The rainfall increased levels along several rivers across the island, including the Río Grande de Arecibo which was reported at several feet above flood stage. Its passage left about 79,000 people without power and 144,000 without water. In the northern portion of the island, the rainfall caused a mudslides that buried an automobile, which killed its driver.

Heavy rainfall fell across the Dominican Republic, with isolated totals of 10 inches (250 mm) expected. The rainfall caused flooding along the Yaque del Norte River, and initially there appeared to be a threat that the Tavera Dam along the river would fail, potentially killing thousands in Santiago Province. Officials instead opted to open all six floodgates at 0400 UTC on December 12, which released about 1.6 million gallons (6.1 million liters) of water into the river every second. The deluge created a 66 foot (20 m) wave of water that caught many off guard due to the time of night and only about 15 minutes to prepare, according to eyewitnesses who criticized the decision; the flooding killed at least 35 people and left homes in seven towns flooded. Two other deaths were reported elsewhere in the country, and more than 34,000 people fled their homes due to the storm; more than 7,500 houses were damaged. Damage in the country was estimated at $1.5 billion (2007 DOP, $45 million 2007 USD). In neighboring Haiti, two deaths were reported in the northern portion of the country. On December 11, a station in the Turks and Caicos Islands recorded sustained winds of 36 mph (58 km/h).

While still moving through the western Caribbean sea, heavy rains fell along a trough in its northeast quadrant beginning on December 14, with a total of 7.08 inches/179.8 mm falling at Nettles Island, Florida. The remnant low intensified due to occasional convection forming near and northeast of the center as it approached the Sunshine State. Clearwater Beach recorded a pressure as low as 1002 mb as well as sustained winds reaching 45 mph (72 km/h), with gusts to 78 mph (126 km/h) between 4 and 5 on the morning of December 16. As a cold front approached, the low pressure area became ill-defined and dissipated before reaching Florida's Space Coast.

== See also ==
- Other storms of the same name
- List of off-season Atlantic hurricanes
