= Tropical Storm Odile (2008) =

Pacific tropical storm in 2008

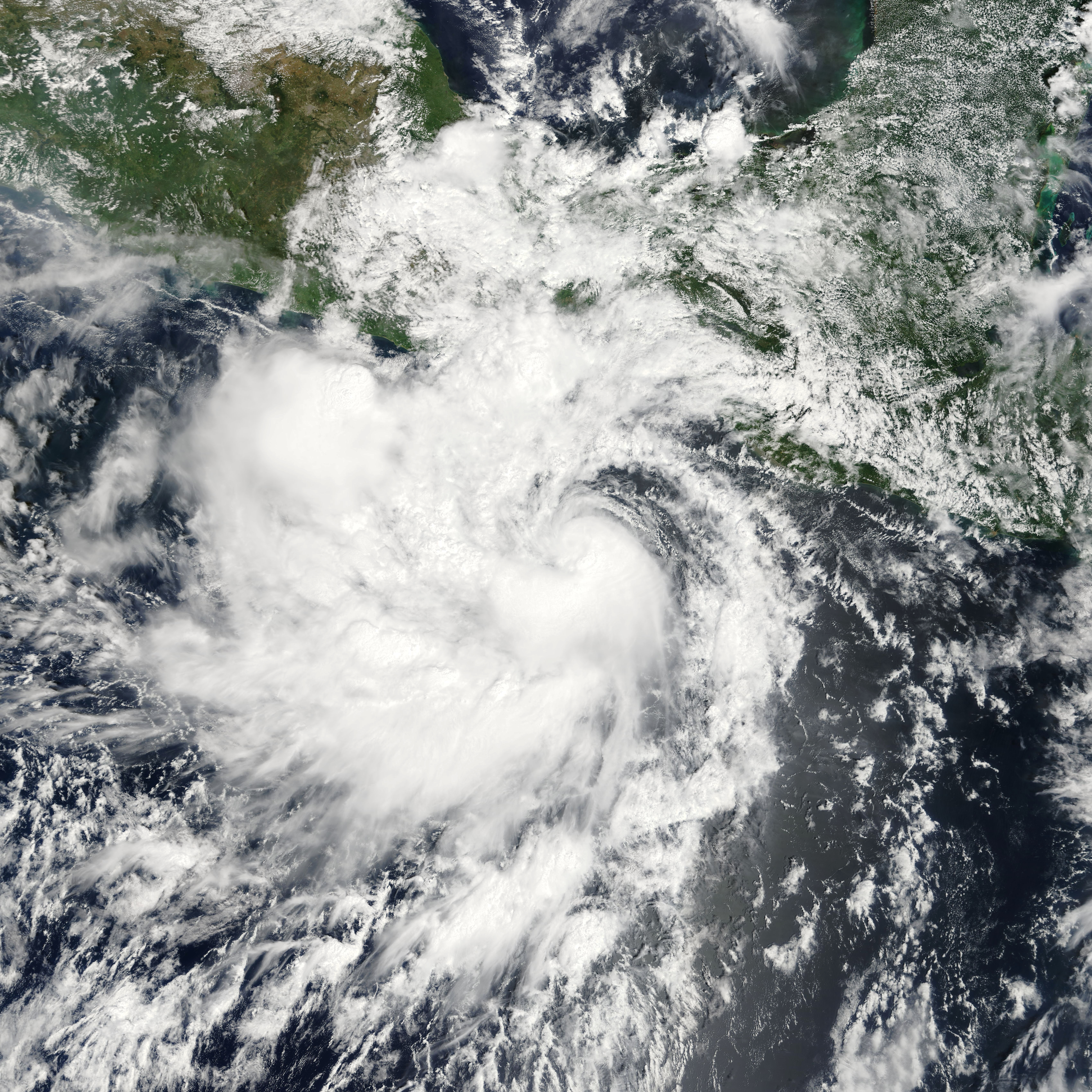
- Tropical Storm Odile intensifying on October 9

Meteorological history
- Formed: October 8, 2008
- Dissipated: October 12, 2008

Tropical storm
- 1-minute sustained (SSHWS/NWS)
- Highest winds: 60 mph (95 km/h)
- Lowest pressure: 997 mbar (hPa); 29.44 inHg

Overall effects
- Fatalities: None reported
- Damage: Minimal
- Areas affected: Nicaragua, Honduras, El Salvador, Guatemala, Southwestern Mexico
- IBTrACS
- Part of the 2008 Pacific hurricane season

Tropical Storm Odile was a late season tropical storm that formed during the 2008 Pacific hurricane season and affected parts of southern Mexico. A tropical depression formed on October 8, and became Tropical Storm Odile 18 hours later. The storm paralleled the south coast of Mexico, with the center located only several miles offshore. After peaking in intensity, increasing southeasterly vertical wind shear induced a trend of rapid weakening on the storm. Correspondingly, Odile was downgraded to a tropical depression early on 12 October, subsequently degenerating into a remnant low about 55 mi (85 km) south of Manzanillo, Colima. From thereon, the low proceeded slowly south-southwestward before dissipating on October 13. Since Odile stayed at sea, its effects along coastlines were limited. The most notable damages were caused by flooding along the southern coast of Mexico, mostly in Chiapas, Oaxaca, Guerrero and Michoacán. The exact amount of damage, however, remains unknown, and no fatalities were reported as a result of the storm.

== Meteorological history ==
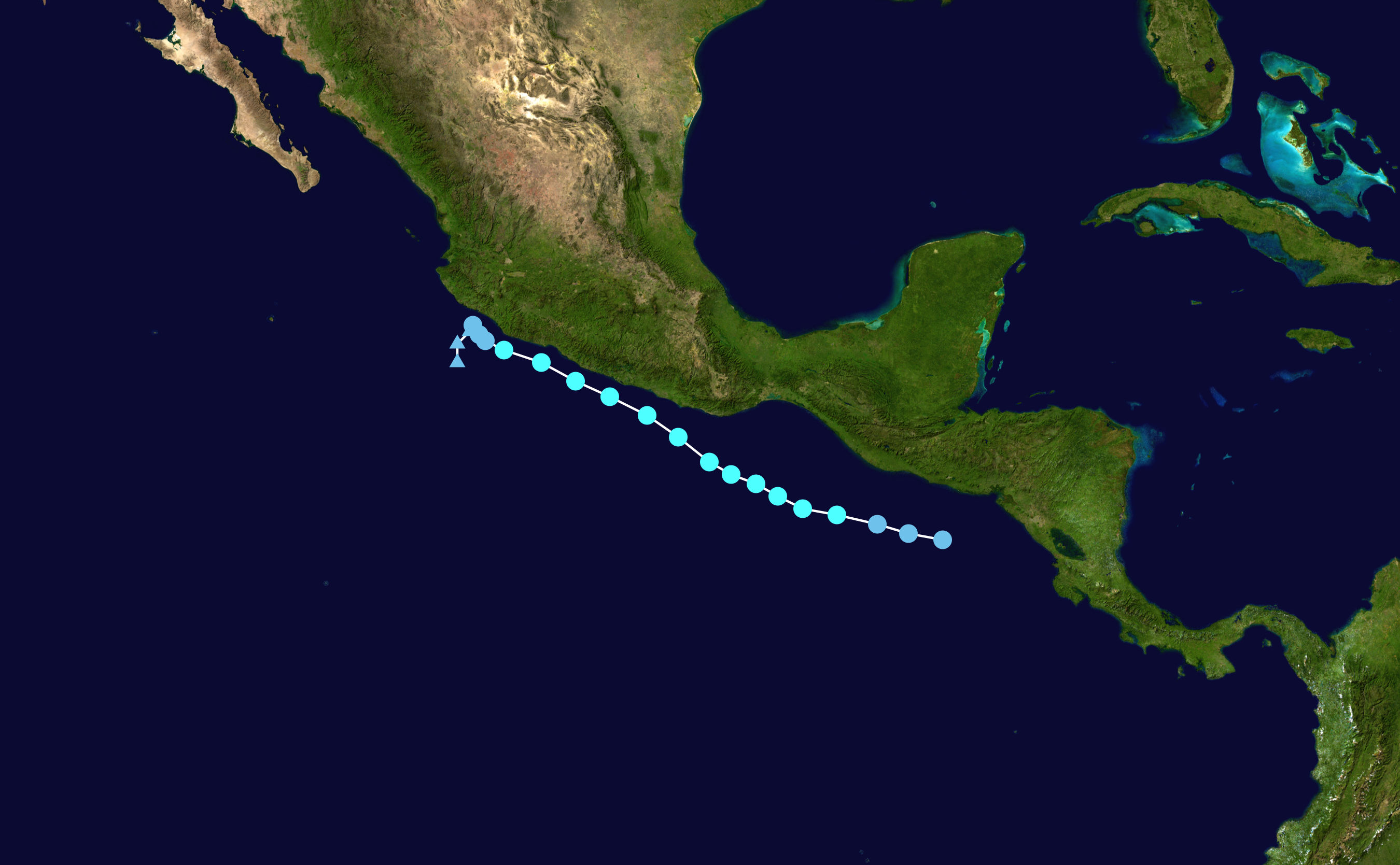
Map plotting the storm's track and intensity, according to the Saffir–Simpson scale Map key Saffir–Simpson scale Tropical depression (≤38 mph, ≤62 km/h) Tropical storm (39–73 mph, 63–118 km/h) Category 1 (74–95 mph, 119–153 km/h) Category 2 (96–110 mph, 154–177 km/h) Category 3 (111–129 mph, 178–208 km/h) Category 4 (130–156 mph, 209–251 km/h) Category 5 (≥157 mph, ≥252 km/h) Unknown Storm type Tropical cyclone Subtropical cyclone Extratropical cyclone, remnant low, tropical disturbance, or monsoon depression

A tropical wave emerged off the west coast of Africa on September 23, and merged with the southern end of a decaying frontal system over the Caribbean Sea. The combined disturbance gradually split, with the northernmost section eventually becoming Tropical Storm Marco. The southernmost end moved into the eastern Pacific, which then immediately showed signs of organization. The system stalled just south of El Salvador throughout October 5, where it came under the influence of strong vertical wind shear. The circulation slowly drifted east-northeastward and became absorbed by a neighboring tropical wave, with the broad resultant low re-curving to the west-northwest. In response to relaxing shear aloft, convection redeveloped around the newly formed center of circulation. It subsequently acquired a sufficiently organized structure and post-analysis found that a tropical depression formed at around 1200 UTC on October 8. Upon developing, the depression was designated as Sixteen-E about 120 mi (195 km) south-southwest of San Salvador, El Salvador, and operationally, advisories were initiated at 2100 UTC — 9 hours after post-analytic estimates of formation.

Despite being in an area with favorable conditions, lack of inner core organization proved difficult for rapid deepening to occur, and initially, model guidance did not forecast any significant strengthening. Contrary to expectations, satellite imagery showed a gradual increase in organization later that evening. Bands of convection deepened in the southern quadrant, indicating that the storm was steadily strengthening. Located just to the south of a large mid-level ridge over Mexico, the system was steered toward the west-northwest, proceeding within a favorable environment. Based on the improved appearance on satellite imagery, it is estimated the depression intensified into Tropical Storm Odile at 0600 UTC on October 9 about 330 mi (530 km) southeast of Puerto Ángel, Mexico. Shortly after attaining tropical storm status, Odile began to develop a small area of central dense overcast, and upper-level cirrus outflow became well-defined within the western semicircle of the storm. Convective banding organized to the south and southwest of the circulation, leading Dvorak T-numbers to estimate an intensity of at least 50 mph (80 km/h). Based on this estimate, the NHC noted a high chance of further intensification into a minimal hurricane. Odile maintained its intensity, as upper-level outflow of the circulation was reduced to the northeast. Although wind shear initially dislocated the circulation from the main convection, a large burst of convection allowed Odile to intensify slightly further to peak winds of 60 mph (95 km/h) at around 0600 UTC on October 10.

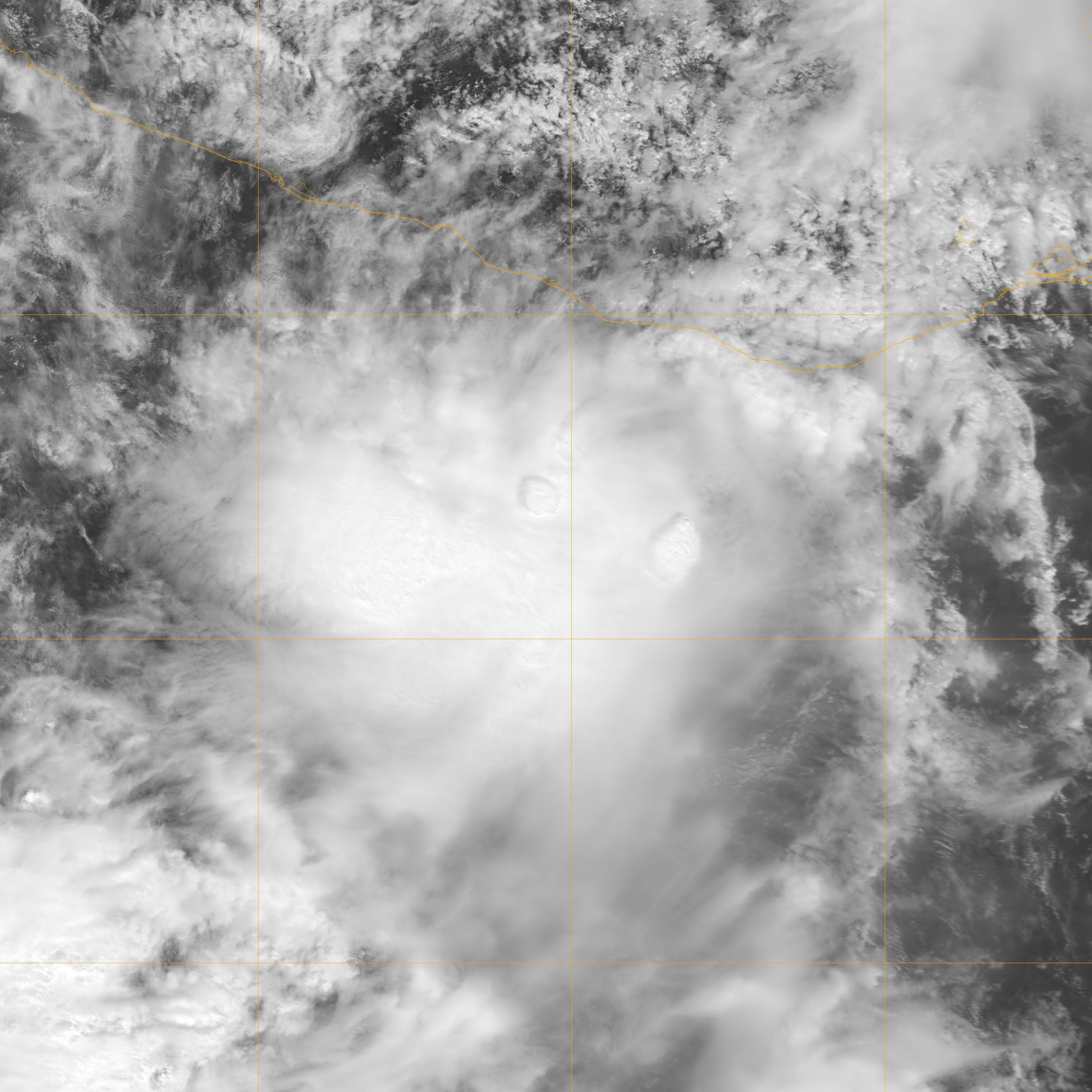
Tropical Storm Odile at peak intensity on October 10

Odile closely paralleled the Mexican coastline. The intensification did not last long, in fact, the convection associated with Odile diminished in the afternoon and its rainbands became rather distorted. Another cluster of convection sprung up that evening, this time with cloud tops colder than −80 °C (−112 °F). The circulation center was well embedded within the convection. As a consequence of the slightly improved organization, Odile had a stronger interaction with the easterlies aloft, therefore increasing forward movement speed. Later that day, a reconnaissance aircraft passed through Odile and observed a rather weak and disorganized tropical cyclone, resulting in meteorologists at the NHC to change its forecasts. Early on October 12, Odile made its closest approach to coastline of Mexico, only about 50 mi (80 km) offshore of Guerrero, Mexico. Increasing southeasterly vertical wind shear took toll on the system. Furthermore, around 0600 UTC, NHC confirmed that Odile weakened into a tropical depression. The last advisory regarding Odile was issued later that day stating that it has subsequently degenerated into a remnant low-pressure area, a swirl of low-level clouds. The remnants of Odile meandered slowly south-southwestward before completely dissipating on October 13.

== Preparations and impact ==
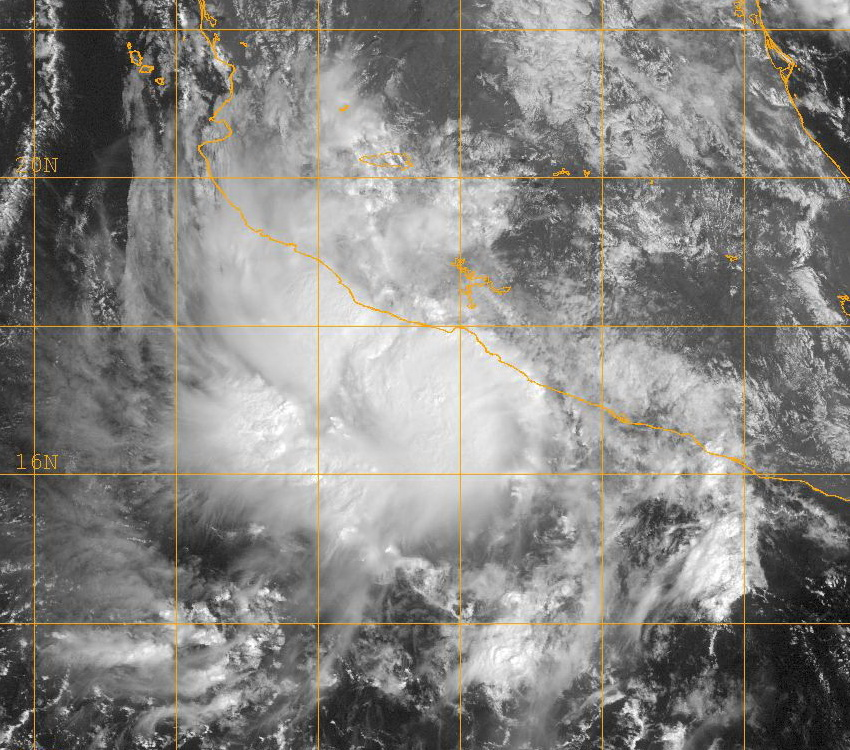
Tropical Storm Odile shortly before losing its intensity

Throughout Odile's existence, the National Weather Service of Mexico declared several tropical storm watches and warnings for the Pacific coast of Mexico spanning from Jalisco to Oaxaca. They were extended and discontinued as Odile progressed westward. On October 11 at around 2 AM PDT, a hurricane watch was declared for the Pacific coast of Mexico from Tecpan de Galeana to Punta San Telmo. Six hours later, the hurricane watch was adjusted and in effect for the coast from Zihuatanejo to Manzanillo. They were all discontinued later that day as the chance of Odile becoming a hurricane diminished.

On October 8, blue alerts were declared for 118 municipalities in Chiapas following the minimal threat of tropical storm-force impact. The civil defense system in the state of Chiapas warned that the storm could leave up to 5.9 in (150 mm) of rainfall. Shippings were closed in the Port of Chiapas, leaving over 3,000 boats stranded ashore on October 9. Flooding in Acapulco forced officials to close schools on October 10. Meanwhile, the state government reported that 232 police were ready to provide assistance to citizens in advance of Odile. Civil defense officials in the state of Guerrero ordered about 10,000 people to evacuate their homes. On October 11, a yellow alert were declared for the state of Michoacán, where the civil defense committee also announced that the shelters were opened for schools in the municipality of Lázaro Cárdenas and the towns of Playa Azul and Guacamayas. Ports in Lázaro Cárdenas were also closed later that day.

On October 10, about 4.8 in (120 mm) of rainfall were accumulated in the city of Acapulco. The torrential rainfall caused flooding which damaged more than 100 houses, with two of them completely destroyed. Excess floodwater collapsed walls and covered roads with mud that reached as much as 2.3 ft (0.70 m). Nearly 150 homes were inundated with 13 ft (4.0 m) of water. The flooding is also responsible for causing strong current that had swept away parked vehicles, downing of at least 16 trees and carrying debris to the main streets of the port. Odile also managed to cause damage toward the plumbing and sewage supplies of Acapulco, resulting no clean water access in about fifty communities of the suburban areas of Acapulco for several days. The water levels of Papagayo River reached its maximum capacity, damaging electrical supplies. In Michoacán, strong winds resulted 30 downed trees and the collapse of 5 power poles, leaving 10 minutes without electricity for a large part of the city.

== See also ==
- 2008 Pacific hurricane season
- Timeline of the 2008 Pacific hurricane season
- Other storms of the same name
