= List of storms named Oma =

The name Oma has been used for two tropical cyclones in the South Pacific Ocean:

- Cyclone Oma (2001) – a Category 1 tropical cyclone that never threatened land.
- Cyclone Oma (2019) – a Category 3 severe tropical cyclone that impacted Vanuatu, New Caledonia and the Solomon Islands.

== See also ==
Storms with similar names

- Tropical Storm Oka (1987) – a Central Pacific tropical storm.
- Tropical Storm Omeka (2010) – another Central Pacific tropical storm that became the latest named storm in the basin in reliable records.
- Cyclone Nisha–Orama (1983) – a Category 4 South Pacific severe tropical cyclone that had two names to mitigate public confusion
