= Typhoon Oscar =

Pacific typhoon in 1995

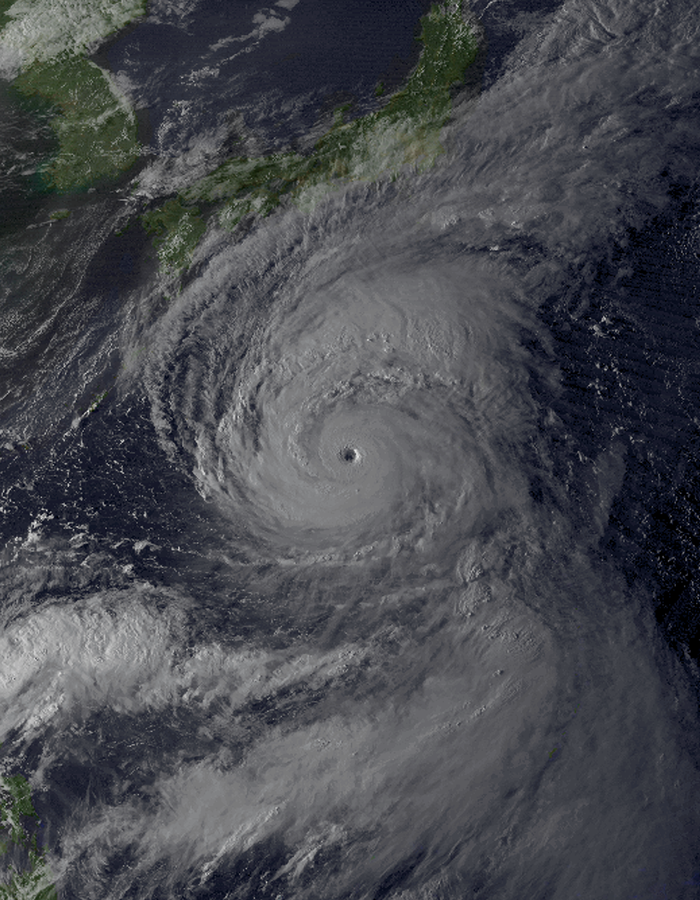
- Oscar at peak intensity on September 15

Meteorological history
- Formed: September 12, 1995
- Extratropical: September 18, 1995
- Dissipated: September 20, 1995

Very strong typhoon
- 10-minute sustained (JMA)
- Highest winds: 185 km/h (115 mph)
- Lowest pressure: 925 hPa (mbar); 27.32 inHg

Category 5-equivalent super typhoon
- 1-minute sustained (SSHWS/JTWC)
- Highest winds: 260 km/h (160 mph)
- Lowest pressure: 898 hPa (mbar); 26.52 inHg

Overall effects
- Fatalities: 8
- Missing: 3
- Damage: $6.7 million (1995 USD)
- Areas affected: Japan
- IBTrACS
- Part of the 1995 Pacific typhoon season

Typhoon Oscar was a powerful typhoon that brushed Japan before recurving to its east. The seventeenth tropical cyclone and second super typhoon of the moderately active 1995 Pacific typhoon season, Oscar formed as a tropical depression a few hundred miles east-northeast of Guam. The tropical depression then strengthened into a tropical storm, and was given the name Oscar. It then reached typhoon status on September 14, becoming a super typhoon later that same day. Oscar recurved northeastwards two days later, skirted past Honshū on 17 September and became extratropical on 18 September.

Oscar affected Tokyo, where numerous buildings sustained severe damage from high winds and several major highways were shut down. At least 20 people were injured by flying debris in Japan. One person was killed in a landslide and another drowned in a flood. Seven more people were killed by Typhoon Oscar throughout the country. Three other people were also listed as missing due to the storm. Although it never made landfall, losses from the storm throughout Japan still amounted to 612.3 million yen (US$6.7 million).

== Meteorological history ==
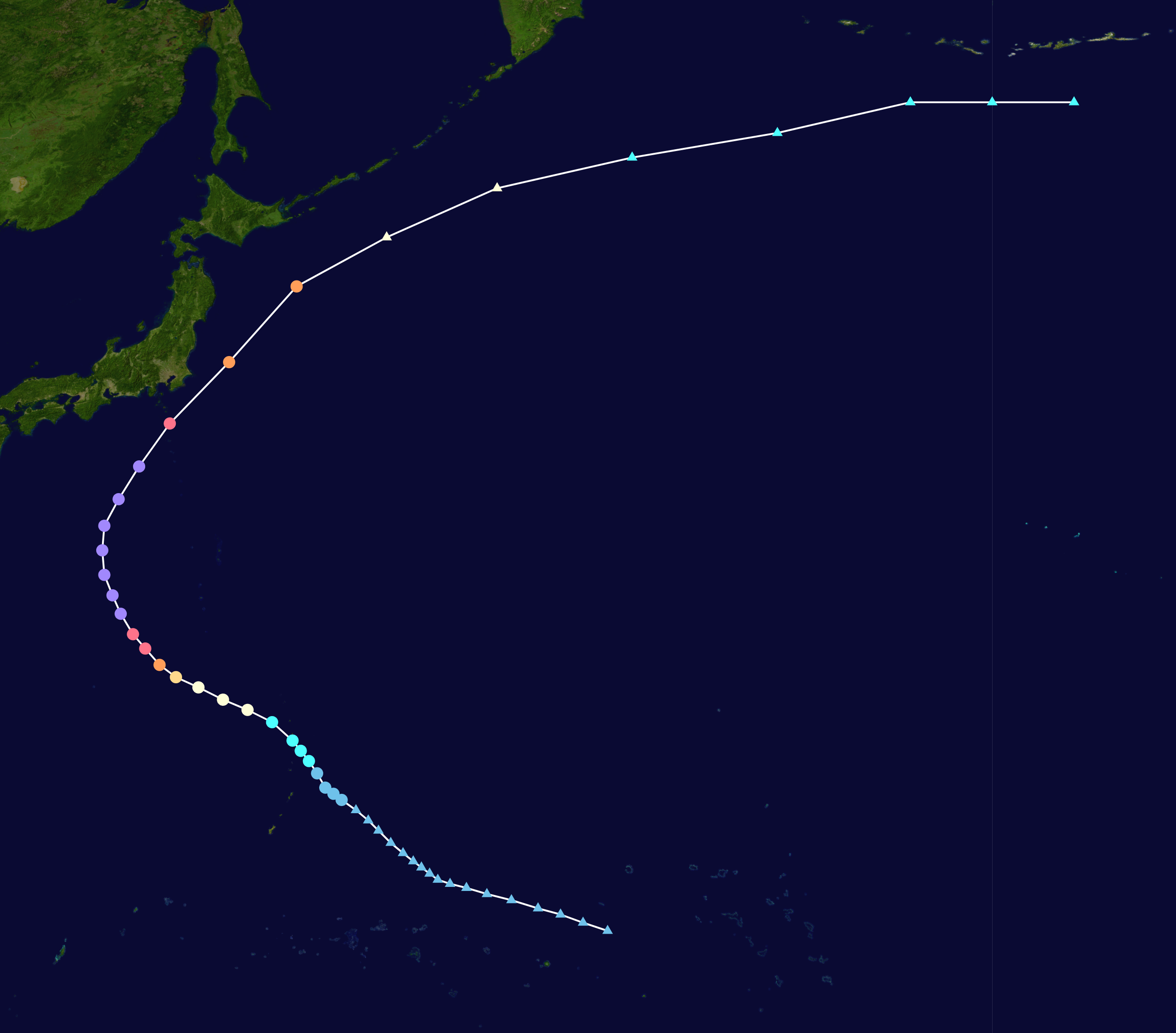
Map plotting the storm's track and intensity, according to the Saffir–Simpson scale Map key Saffir–Simpson scale Tropical depression (≤38 mph, ≤62 km/h) Tropical storm (39–73 mph, 63–118 km/h) Category 1 (74–95 mph, 119–153 km/h) Category 2 (96–110 mph, 154–177 km/h) Category 3 (111–129 mph, 178–208 km/h) Category 4 (130–156 mph, 209–251 km/h) Category 5 (≥157 mph, ≥252 km/h) Unknown Storm type Tropical cyclone Subtropical cyclone Extratropical cyclone, remnant low, tropical disturbance, or monsoon depression

About almost a month without any tropical cyclones reaching tropical storm strength, with Tropical Storm Nina being the most recent, a new tropical depression, designated Tropical Depression 17W by the Joint Typhoon Warning Center (JTWC), formed over the Pacific about 380 kilometers (240 miles) east-northeast of Guam on the early morning of September 12. Tracking northwestwards and intensifying over water, Oscar attained typhoon strength on September 14.

Typhoon Oscar reached its maximum intensity of high winds with 260 kilometres per hour (160 miles per hour) and a minimum central pressure of 925 millibars (hPa; 27.32 inHg) on September 14. The eye was well-developed, and it headed towards Japan.

Oscar recurved northeastwards two days later, skirted past Honshū on September 17 and started weakening. Oscar was downgraded to a tropical storm, then the system became extratropical on September 18. In Japan, Oscar claimed nine lives and injured at least 13 people. Six people were reported missing and about 600 houses were damaged by high winds and flood water.

== Preparations and impact ==
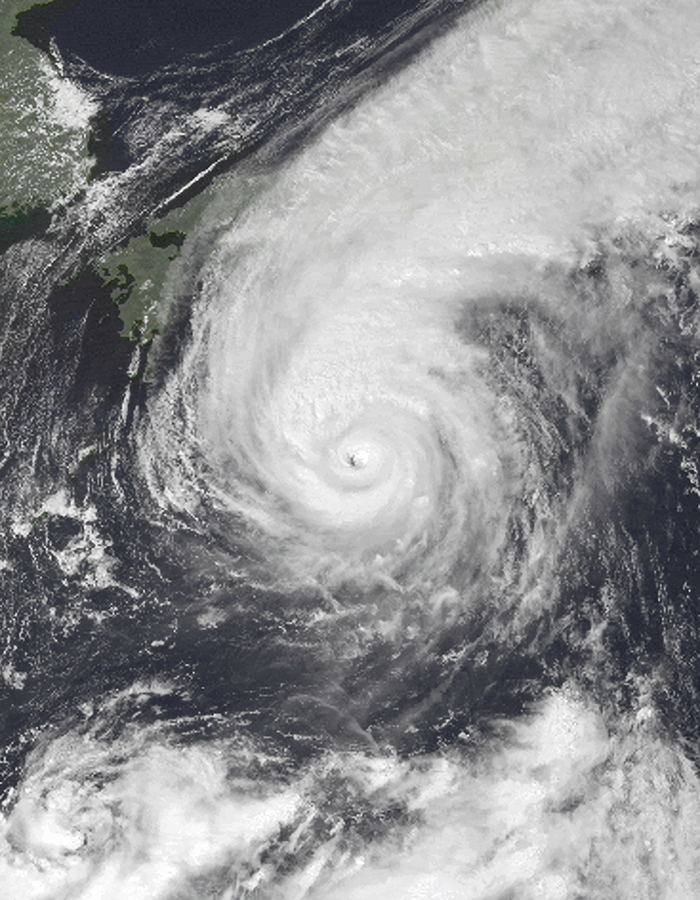
Typhoon Oscar approaching Japan on September 16

Dozens of domestic flights and sea ferries were canceled. Storm and flood warnings were issued across most of Japan's eastern coastal and central areas.

As the typhoon's center moved north, the most powerful area near its center touched coastal areas southeast of Tokyo. At 6 A.M. on September 17, the typhoon was centered almost directly over Aoga Island, 225 miles south of Tokyo, moving north-northeast at 21 miles per hour. Forecasters predicted that Tokyo would receive up to 12 inches of rain over 36 hours. Seven major train lines and subways in and around Tokyo reduced service. There were no immediate reports of injuries, but wind-carried objects, such as tree branches, hurt at least 20 people and sudden wind gusts knocked people down.

Typhoon Oscar's winds reached 174 kilometres per hour (108 miles per hour), making it comparable to Typhoon Ida that killed 1,269 people in 1958 and 5,098 from Typhoon Vera in 1959 in the Tokyo-Yokohama area. It was one of the most powerful typhoons to hit Japan since World War II, dealing the east coast a glancing blow before veering out to sea. Two people were killed, and three were missing.

== See also ==
- Other tropical cyclones named Oscar
- Typhoon Ida (1958)
- Typhoon Vera (1959)
- Typhoon Faxai (2019)
- Typhoon Ampil (2024)
