= List of storms named Odessa =

The name Odessa has been used for one tropical cyclone in the Eastern Pacific Ocean and three in the Western Pacific Ocean.

In the Eastern Pacific:

- Hurricane Odessa (1964)

In the Western Pacific:

- Typhoon Odessa (1982) (T8203, 03W)
- Typhoon Odessa (1985) (T8512, 13W)
- Typhoon Odessa (1988) (T8825, 25W, Seniang)
