= List of storms named Orson =

The name Orson has been used for two tropical cyclones worldwide: one in the Western Pacific Ocean and one in the Australian Region.

In the Western Pacific:

- Typhoon Orson (1996) – a Category 4 typhoon not affect.

In the Australian region:

- Cyclone Orson (1989) – a Category 5 severe tropical cyclone made landfall near Dampier.
