= Hurricane Odile (1984) =

Category 2 Pacific hurricane in 1984

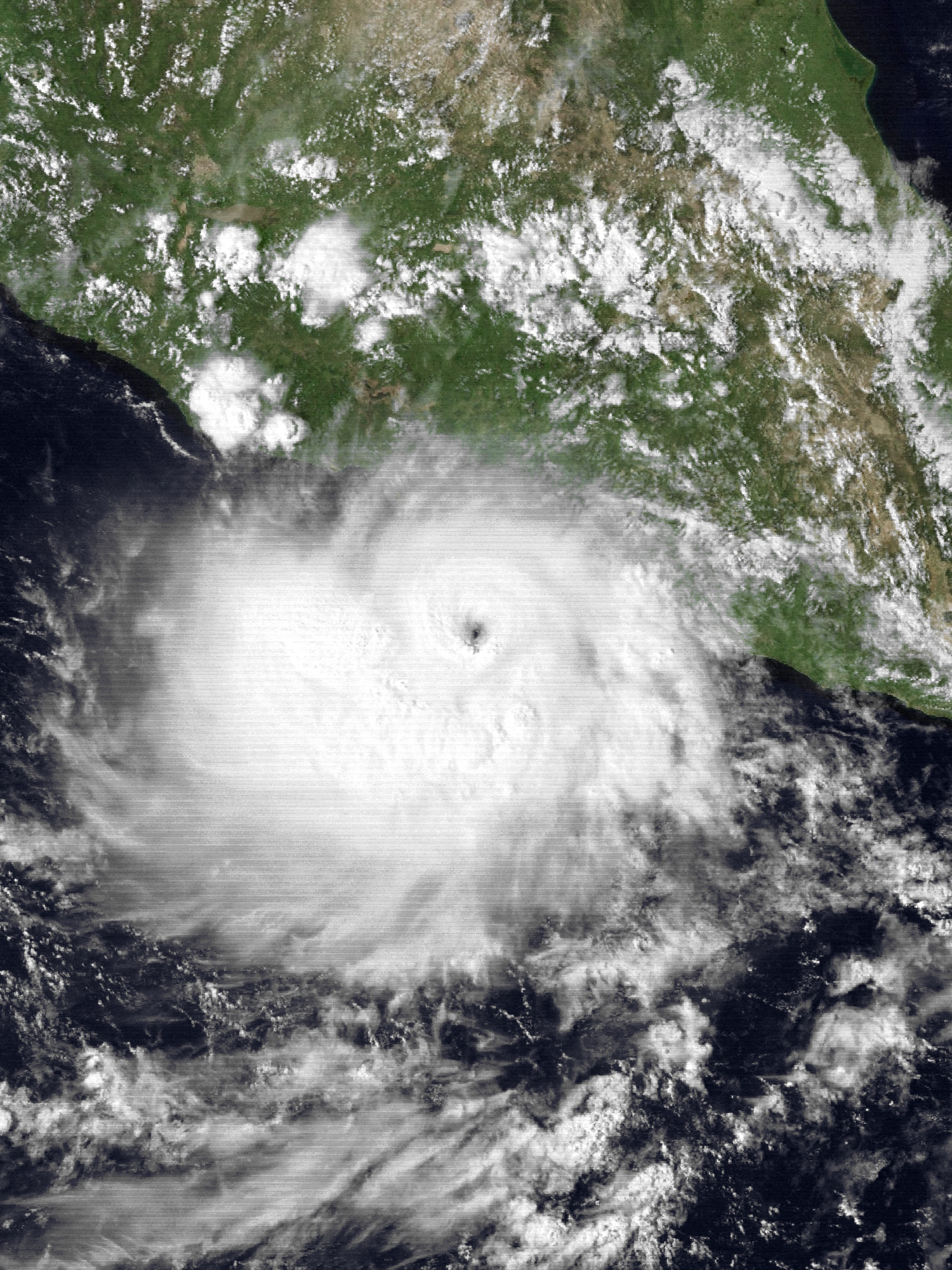
- Hurricane Odile at peak intensity off the coast of Mexico on September 21

Meteorological history
- Formed: September 17, 1984
- Dissipated: September 23, 1984

Category 2 hurricane
- 1-minute sustained (SSHWS/NWS)
- Highest winds: 105 mph (165 km/h)

Overall effects
- Fatalities: 21 total
- Damage: Unknown
- Areas affected: Southwestern Mexico
- Part of the 1984 Pacific hurricane season

Hurricane Odile was the second of three tropical storms to make landfall in Mexico during the 1984 Pacific hurricane season. The fifteenth named storm and twelfth hurricane of the active season, it developed from a tropical disturbance about 185 miles (298 km) south of Acapulco on September 17. Curving towards the northwest, Odile became a Category 1 hurricane on September 19. The tropical cyclone reached its peak intensity with winds of 105 mph (169 km/h) two days later; however, Hurricane Odile began to weaken as moved erratically it encountered less favorable conditions and was downgraded to a tropical storm shortly before making landfall northwest of Zihuatanejo. Over land, the storm rapidly weakened, and dissipated on September 23. The storm caused significant rainfall accumulations of 24.73 inches (628 mm) in Southern Mexico, resulting in severe damage to tourism resorts. Flooding from Odile resulted in the evacuation of 7,000 people, 21 deaths, and the damage of about 900 homes.

== Meteorological history ==
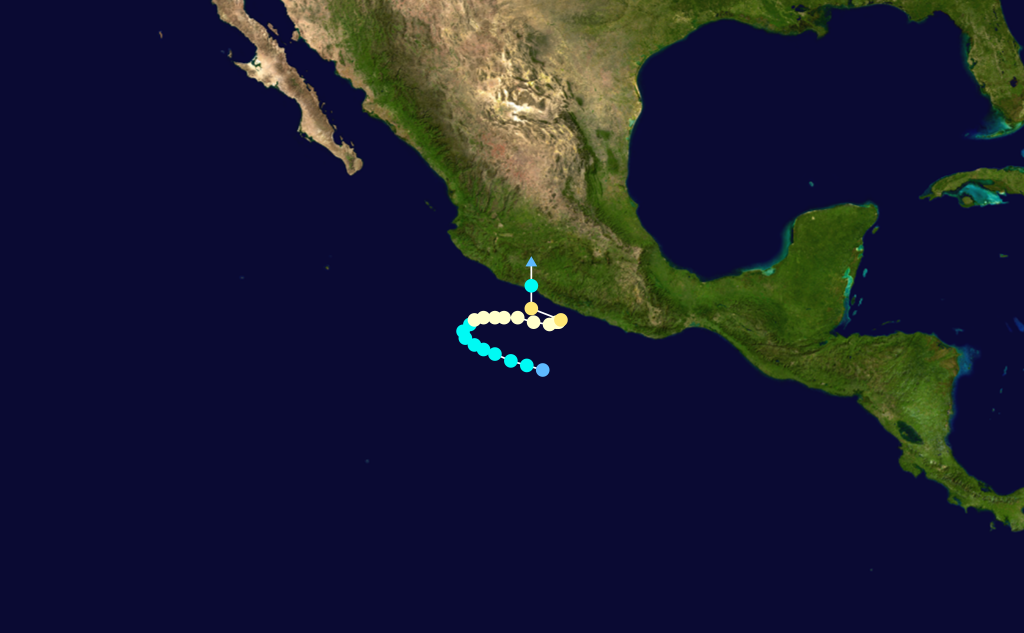
Map plotting the storm's track and intensity, according to the Saffir–Simpson scale Map key Saffir–Simpson scale Tropical depression (≤38 mph, ≤62 km/h) Tropical storm (39–73 mph, 63–118 km/h) Category 1 (74–95 mph, 119–153 km/h) Category 2 (96–110 mph, 154–177 km/h) Category 3 (111–129 mph, 178–208 km/h) Category 4 (130–156 mph, 209–251 km/h) Category 5 (≥157 mph, ≥252 km/h) Unknown Storm type Tropical cyclone Subtropical cyclone Extratropical cyclone, remnant low, tropical disturbance, or monsoon depression

A tropical disturbance was first noted about 150 mi (240 km) south of Acapulco on September 16. After tracking over 84 °F (29 °C) waters, the disturbance began to strengthen, and became a depression at 18:00 UTC on September 17. The depression began to curve more towards the northwest beneath a narrow ridge located over southern Mexico and south of an upper-level low over northern Mexico. About 24 hours after developing into a tropical cyclone, the Eastern Pacific Hurricane Center (EPHC) upgraded the depression to Tropical Storm Odile. At 00:00 UTC on September 20, Odile attained hurricane status while turning towards the east between the ridge and an upper-level low.

Late on September 21, Hurricane Odile reached its peak intensity of 105 mph (169 km/h), which made it a Category 2 hurricane on the Saffir-Simpson Hurricane Scale, as it approached Acapulco. Due to a combination of an upper level trough that moved southward over the Baja California Peninsula and the weakening of the ridge, the hurricane began to turn more northwestward. After maintaining peak intensity for 12 hours, Odile started to weaken, as the storm began to encounter cooler sea surface temperatures. The hurricane rapidly weakened to tropical storm status while approaching the coast of Mexico; within a six-hour period, the winds diminished from 100 to 60 mph (160 to 95 km/h). By late on September 22, Odile made landfall about 50 mi (80 km) northwest of Zihuatanejo, with winds of 50 mph (80 km/h). Less than six hours later, at 00:00 UTC on September 23, Odile ceased to exist as a tropical cyclone. While its surface circulation rapidly weakened over the mountains of western Mexico, the remnants of Odile moved northwest, passing east of Manzanillo before weakening as it re-curved towards Texas.

== Preparations and impact ==
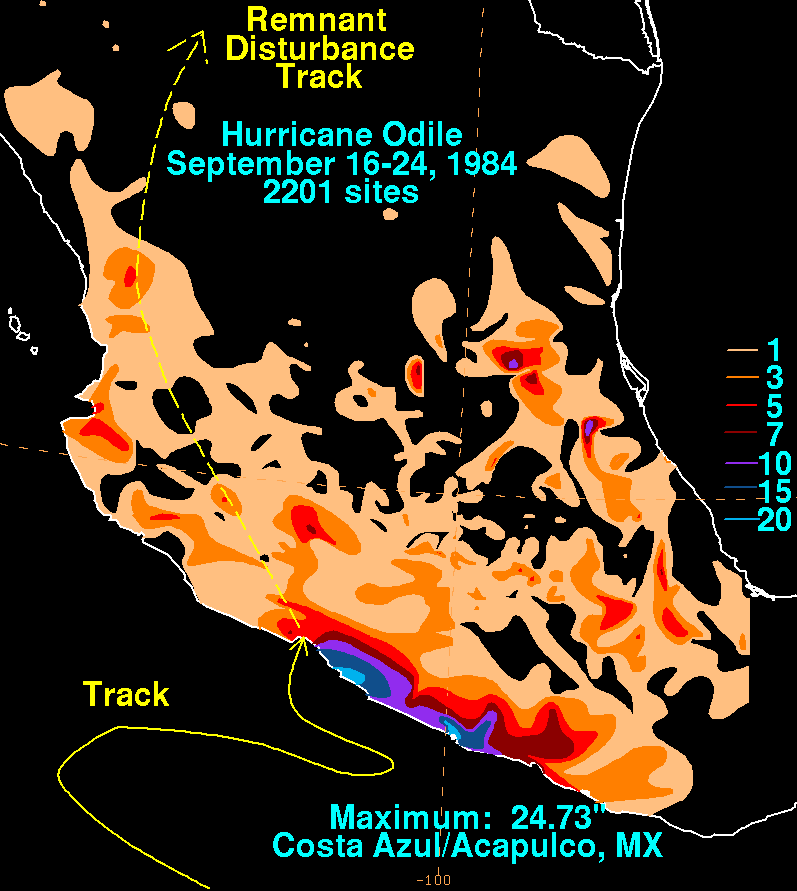
Rainfall totals in Mexico

Due to the storm's slow motion, Odile dropped heavy rainfall over a prolonged period across Southern Mexico. Nation-wide, the maximum rainfall totals of 24.73 in (628 mm) occurred in Costa Azul and Acapulco. In all, Odile, in conjunction with a series of storms that affected the country in 1984, brought the heaviest rains to the region since 1978. Acapulco Mayor Alfonso Arugdin Alcaraz reported that flooding inundated 30 miles (50 km) of highways, damaged roughly 900 homes, and left 20,000 families without running water. According to press reports, flooding triggered an evacuation of 7,000 people across the city, and six people were killed, with two others reported missing. However, these reports were not confirmed because telephone circuits between Acapulco and Mexico City were down. Commercial flights in Acapulco were suspended on September 21, but were resumed on September 23, even though the airline terminal remained flooded by more than 3 ft (910 mm) of water.

The city of Zihuatanejo was left without electricity since the hurricane had knocked down two high-tension towers. Throughout Guerrero, 80% of all crops were damaged. Across the Ixtapa-Zihuatanejo corridor, several dozen adobe and other poorly constructed huts had their walls damaged and roofs blown away by strong winds. Slight damage was reported in the area, although there were no reports of injuries or fatalities. Nevertheless, the tourism industry in Acapulco and Ixtapa-Zihuatenejo was severely affected by Odile and the preceding storms, with few foreign tourists visiting the area. Officials estimated that hotels were only 5% full in Acapulco. Overall, a total of 44 riverbanks and 30,000 residents were isolated due to flooding. There were a total of 21 confirmed fatalities from the storm after 18 passengers and 3 crewman drowned on the Atoyac River. As a result of Odile and a combination of other storms that hit the country in 1984, crop losses were estimated at US$60 million, (Note: All damage totals are in 1984 values of their respective currencies.) mostly from corn, beans, wheat, rice and sorghum.

== See also ==
- Other tropical cyclones named Odile
