= List of storms named Orla =

The name Orla has been used for two tropical cyclones in the East Pacific Ocean:

- Tropical Storm Orla (1961)
- Tropical Storm Orla (1968)
