= List of storms named Olga =

The name Olga has been used seventeen tropical cyclones worldwide: three in the Atlantic Ocean, ten in the Western Pacific Ocean, and four in the Australian region in Southern Hemisphere. It has also been used for a European windstorm.

In the Atlantic:

- Hurricane Olga (2001) – large Category 1 hurricane that had no effect on land
- Tropical Storm Olga (2007) – off-season storm that killed 40 people, mostly in the Dominican Republic
- Tropical Storm Olga (2019) – formed in the Gulf of Mexico, then caused severe damage as an extratropical system across the Central United States

In the Western Pacific:

- Tropical Storm Olga (1948) (T4827)
- Typhoon Olga (1954) (T5417)
- Typhoon Olga (1958) (T5830)
- Typhoon Olga (1961) (T6119, 51W)
- Tropical Storm Olga (1964) (22W) – formed and remained in the Gulf of Tonkin
- Tropical Storm Olga (1966) (T6634, 37W, Wening)
- Typhoon Olga (1970) (T7002, 02W, Deling) – affected Japan
- Typhoon Olga (1972) (T7226, 28W) – struck the Marshall Islands and the Northern Marianas, causing minimal damage
- Typhoon Olga (1976) (T7605, 05W, Didang) – affected the Philippines and Japan
- Typhoon Olga (1999) (T9907, 11W, Ising) – killed 106 people in North and South Korea and caused $657 million in damage

In the Australian region:

- Cyclone Olga (1981)
- Cyclone Olga (2000) – paralleled the Kimberley and Pilbara coasts
- Cyclone Olga (2010) – crossed the lower Cape York Peninsula and then meandered in the southern Gulf of Carpentaria
- Cyclone Olga (2024) – Category 5 severe tropical cyclone that dissipated off the coast of Western Australia

In Europe:

- Storm Olga
