= Typhoon Opal (1964) =

Pacific typhoon in 1964

Typhoon Opal (Naning)
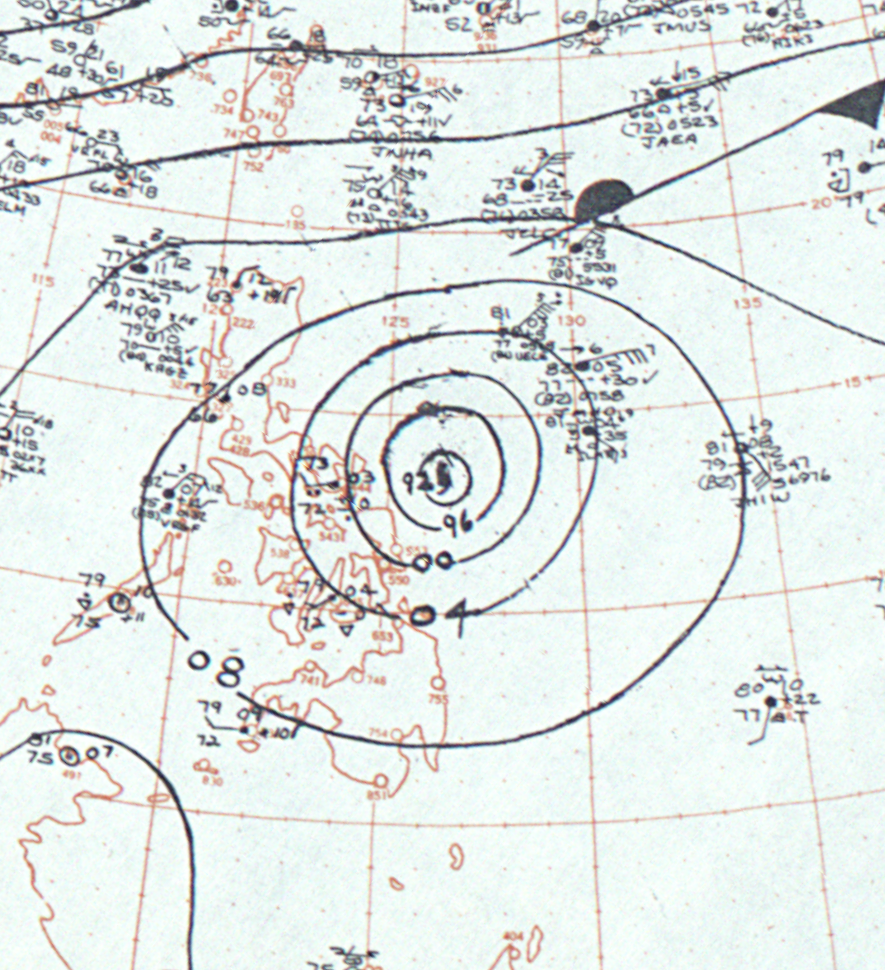
- Typhoon Opal's surface analysis on December 13, 1964.

Meteorological history
- Formed: December 9, 1964
- Dissipated: December 16, 1964

Unknown-strength storm
- 10-minute sustained (JMA)
- Lowest pressure: 895 hPa (mbar); 26.43 inHg

Category 5-equivalent super typhoon
- 1-minute sustained (SSHWS/JTWC)
- Highest winds: 315 km/h (195 mph)
- Lowest pressure: 903 hPa (mbar); 26.67 inHg

Overall effects
- Fatalities: 26
- Damage: >$25 million (1964 USD)
- Areas affected: Caroline Islands, Chuuk, Philippines
- Part of the 1964 Pacific typhoon season

Typhoon Opal, known in the Philippines as Super Typhoon Naning, was an intense Category 5-equivalent typhoon in the extremely active 1964 Pacific typhoon season. Opal also had the largest wind circulation of any typhoon in 1964, with a total span of 2,100 km (1,300 mi).Data from the Joint Typhoon Warning Center (JTWC) indicated that Opal's winds were the highest of any typhoon in 1964. As the thirty-ninth named storm and the twenty-sixth typhoon of the season, it originated from a tropical wave in early December, with its wind circulation developing by December 8. This system quickly organized, gaining the name Opal, and reaching typhoon status on December 9. Opal moved through Yap and Palau for two days. On that last day, Opal reached its peak intensity with one-minute sustained winds of 315 km/h (196 mph) and a central pressure of 895 hPa (26.43 inHg). On December 14, Opal passed north of some Filipino islands and its winds began to lose intensity. Later that day, Opal made landfall in the Philippines with one-minute sustained winds of 140 km/h (87 mph). Opal weakened further as it moved over Luzon. Its center then executed a small counterclockwise loop over western Luzon before curving north and briefly emerging into Lingayen Gulf as a tropical storm. Opal crossed northwestern Luzon and the Babuyan Islands on December 16 and later became extratropical near Okinawa on December 17; this phase of Opal's development dissipated the next day.

== Meteorological history ==
Map plotting the storm's track and intensity, according to the Saffir–Simpson scale Map key Saffir–Simpson scale Tropical depression (≤38 mph, ≤62 km/h) Tropical storm (39–73 mph, 63–118 km/h) Category 1 (74–95 mph, 119–153 km/h) Category 2 (96–110 mph, 154–177 km/h) Category 3 (111–129 mph, 178–208 km/h) Category 4 (130–156 mph, 209–251 km/h) Category 5 (≥157 mph, ≥252 km/h) Unknown Storm type Tropical cyclone Subtropical cyclone Extratropical cyclone, remnant low, tropical disturbance, or monsoon depression

Opal formed from a tropical wave moving through the Caroline Islands in early December, with an initial wind circulation developing by December 8. The newly formed system organized quickly; by the time a reconnaissance aircraft encountered the system 160 km (99 mi) southwest of Chuuk Lagoon on December 9, Opal was already a typhoon with an eye spanning 40 km (25 mi) across. Between December 10–12, Opal moved between Yap and Palau, passing 65 km (40 mi) north of Kayangel with one-minute sustained winds of 260 km/h (160 mph). On December 12, Opal reached its peak intensity with one-minute sustained winds of 315 km/h (196 mph) and a central pressure of 895 hPa (26.43 inHg). On December 14, Opal passed north of Catanduanes and Polillo Island and its winds began to lessen. Later that day, Opal made landfall on central Luzon with one-minute sustained winds of 140 km/h (87 mph). The typhoon weakened further as it moved over Luzon. Its center then executed a small counterclockwise loop over western Luzon before curving north and briefly emerging into Lingayen Gulf as a tropical storm. Opal crossed northwestern Luzon and the Babuyan Islands on December 16 and later became extratropical near Okinawa on December 17; this phase of Opal's development dissipated the next day.

== Preparations and impact ==
Opal inflicted minor damage to a few homes in Palau, where winds reached an estimated 140 km/h (87 mph). Tent homes in Angaur and Peleliu were inundated by storm surge. The Philippine Weather Bureau initially issued storm warnings for the eastern Visayas and Mindanao on December 13 in anticipation of Opal; these warnings were later extended to southern and central Luzon. Philippine Airlines cancelled all flights scheduled for the afternoon of December 14 and the U.S. military moved its Luzon-based aircraft to safety. Manila International Airport closed and railways were brought to a standstill. Some schools and offices in Manila were forced to close due to Opal's rains. The total cost of damage caused by Opal in the Philippines was estimated at US$25 million. Two people were killed and another three were injured in Virac, Catanduanes, after their house was razed by a landslide caused by torrential rainfall. Opal caused significant property damage in Luzon and disrupted communications. Rice crops were damaged by heavy rainfall, and together with coconut crops, sustained losses estimated in the millions of U.S. dollars. These crop losses were most severe in central and southeast Luzon. A washout led to the derailing of eight coaches on passenger train carrying 1,500 passengers in Quezon. Another train with 400–500 passengers collided with a goods wagon blown onto the tracks by Opal's winds, though no injuries were reported. A freighter was driven ashore by the typhoon at Jose Panganiban. In total, 26 people were killed and thousands of others were left homeless in the wake of Opal in the Philippines. The Philippine government designated 54 provinces and cities disaster areas. Rough seas from Opal off Okinawa swept two people off a ship stranded on a reef during a rescue operation, leading to their deaths.

== See also ==
- Typhoon Irma (Klaring; 1966) – a typhoon that took an identical track; sunk the Pioneer Cebu and Banca Alex.
- Typhoon Ivan (Narsing; 1997) – a very strong typhoon that took a similar track.
- Typhoon Zeb (Iliang; 1998) – a category 5-equivalent typhoon that took a comparable track.
- Typhoon Nanmadol (Yayang; 2004) – an intense typhoon that affected similar areas.
- Tropical Storm Choi-wan (Dante; 2021) – a tropical storm that also brought impacts in the Philippines.
