= List of storms named Oscar =

The name Oscar has been used for seven tropical cyclones and one extratropical cyclone worldwide.

In the Atlantic Ocean:

- Tropical Storm Oscar (2012) – minimal tropical storm that formed in the open ocean
- Hurricane Oscar (2018) – Category 2 hurricane that did not affect land
- Hurricane Oscar (2024) – compact Category 1 hurricane that made landfall on Grand Turk Island and in eastern Cuba

In the Western Pacific Ocean:

- Typhoon Oscar (1995) (T9518, 17W) – affected Japan

In the South Pacific:

- Cyclone Oscar (1983) – severely impacted Fiji

Due to its impacts in Fiji, the name Oscar was retired from the South Pacific tropical cyclone naming list.

In the Australian region:

- Cyclone Oscar (1993)
- Cyclone Oscar–Itseng (2004)

In Europe:

- Storm Oscar (2023) – extratropical cyclone that caused minor impacts across Europe
