= List of storms named Odalys =

The name Odalys has been used for two tropical cyclones in the Eastern Pacific Ocean.

- Tropical Storm Odalys (2020), late-season storm that stayed at sea
- Hurricane Odalys (2026), a Category 4 hurricane that did not threaten land
