= Typhoon Ofelia =

Pacific typhoon in 1990

Typhoon Ofelia (Bising)
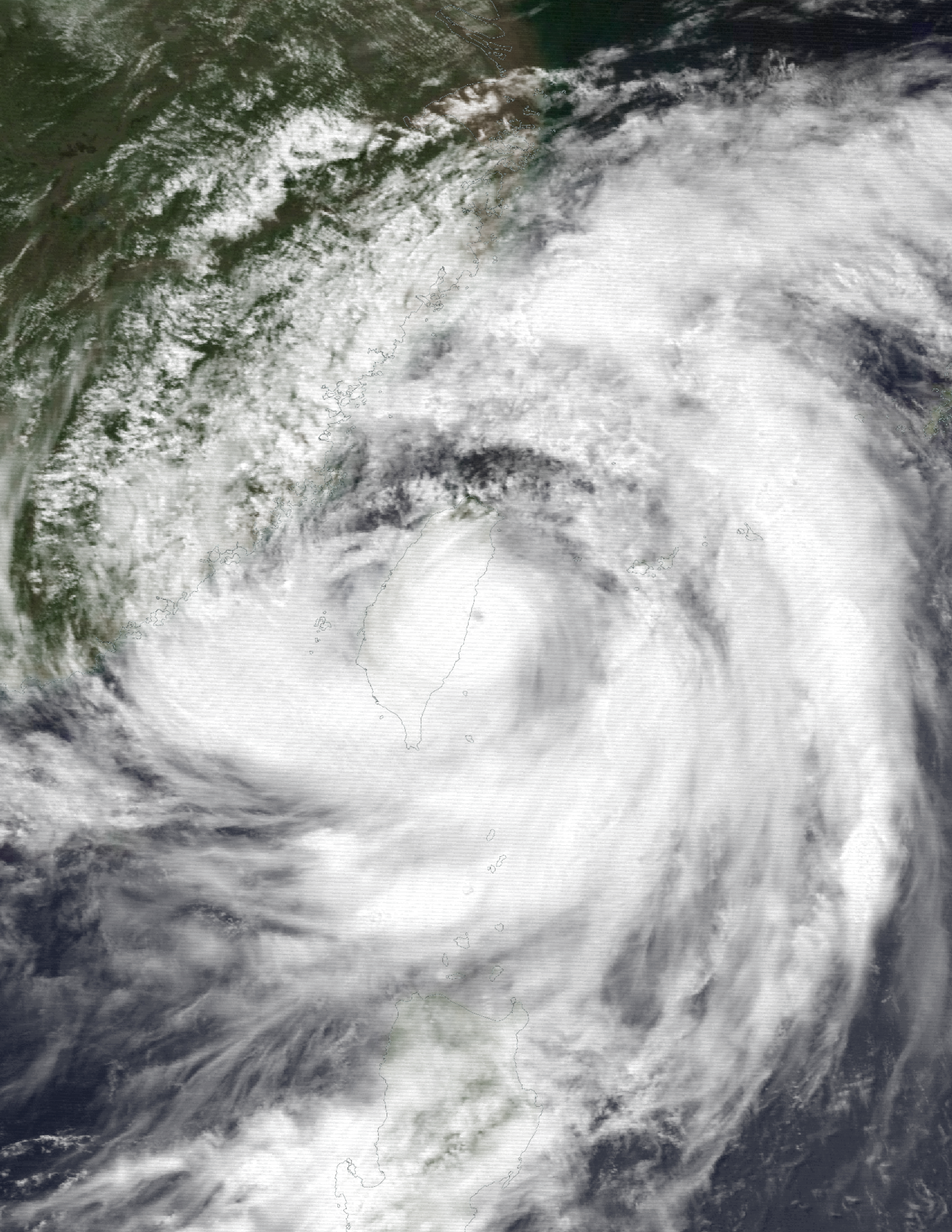
- Typhoon Ofelia near peak intensity

Meteorological history
- Formed: June 16, 1990
- Dissipated: June 25, 1990

Typhoon
- 10-minute sustained (JMA)
- Highest winds: 120 km/h (75 mph)
- Lowest pressure: 970 hPa (mbar); 28.64 inHg

Category 2-equivalent typhoon
- 1-minute sustained (SSHWS/JTWC)
- Highest winds: 165 km/h (105 mph)

Overall effects
- Fatalities: 96 confirmed
- Missing: 23
- Damage: $207 million (1990 USD)
- Areas affected: Philippines, Taiwan, China
- IBTrACS
- Part of the 1990 Pacific typhoon season

Typhoon Ofelia, known as Typhoon Bising in the Philippines, was the first of two typhoons in 1990 to directly affect the Philippines within a week. Typhoon Ofelia originated from an area of disturbed weather embedded in the monsoon trough situated near the Caroline Islands. Slowly organizing, the disturbance tracked westward, and was designated a tropical depression on June 15. After an increase in convection, the depression was upgraded into a tropical storm on June 17. On June 19, Ofelia turned northwest and after development of a central dense overcast, Ofelia was upgraded into a typhoon late on June 20. After turning north, Ofelia obtained its maximum intensity following the development of an eye. The typhoon skirted past the northeastern tip of Luzon and near the east coast of Taiwan, commencing a rapid weakening trend. On the evening on June 23, Ofelia struck the southern portion of Zhejiang. The storm then began to track north, recurving towards the Korean Peninsula. The storm tracked through the province of Jiangsu, and at 00:00 UTC on June 24, transitioned into an extratropical cyclone, only to merge with a frontal zone on June 25.

Although the inner core avoided the Philippines, the storm's large size resulted in inundation across the northern Philippines. The province of La Union was the hardest hit by the typhoon, where 22 people were killed and 90 homes were crushed. Three children perished and six others sustained injuries in Pasig. Overall, 56 people were killed and over 85,000 individuals were forced to flee their homes. Taiwan bore a direct landfall from Ofelia, dropping up to 460 mm (18 in) of rain. Hualien City was the hardest hit by the typhoon, where five people were killed. In all, Ofelia was the worst to hit eastern Taiwan in 30 years. More than 200 houses were destroyed or damaged and roughly 8,500 hectares (21,000 acres) of rice paddies and vegetables were flooded. Roads and highways were blocked by landslides and floods. Agricultural losses exceeded NT$2.55 billion (US$94.7 million). (Note: All currencies are converted from Taiwanese Dollars to United States Dollars using this with an exchange rate of the year 1990.) (Note: All damage totals are in 1990 values of their respective currencies.) Seventeen people died and twenty-three were missing due to flooding and mudslides. Although during a weakening phase at the time, the typhoon drenched central China. In Wenzhou, 12 people were killed and monetary damage was estimated at 205 million RMB (US$42.8 million). (Note: All currencies are converted from Yuans to United States Dollars using this with an exchange rate of the year 1990.) In the province of Zhejiang, 15 fatalities were reported and 21 others were injured. In the neighboring province of Fujian, 15 people perished and 9,044 houses were demolished. About 91,000 hectares (220,000 acres) of farmland were inundated and damage was estimated at 338 million RMB (US$70.5 million). Nationwide, 40 people were killed by Ofelia.

== Meteorological history ==
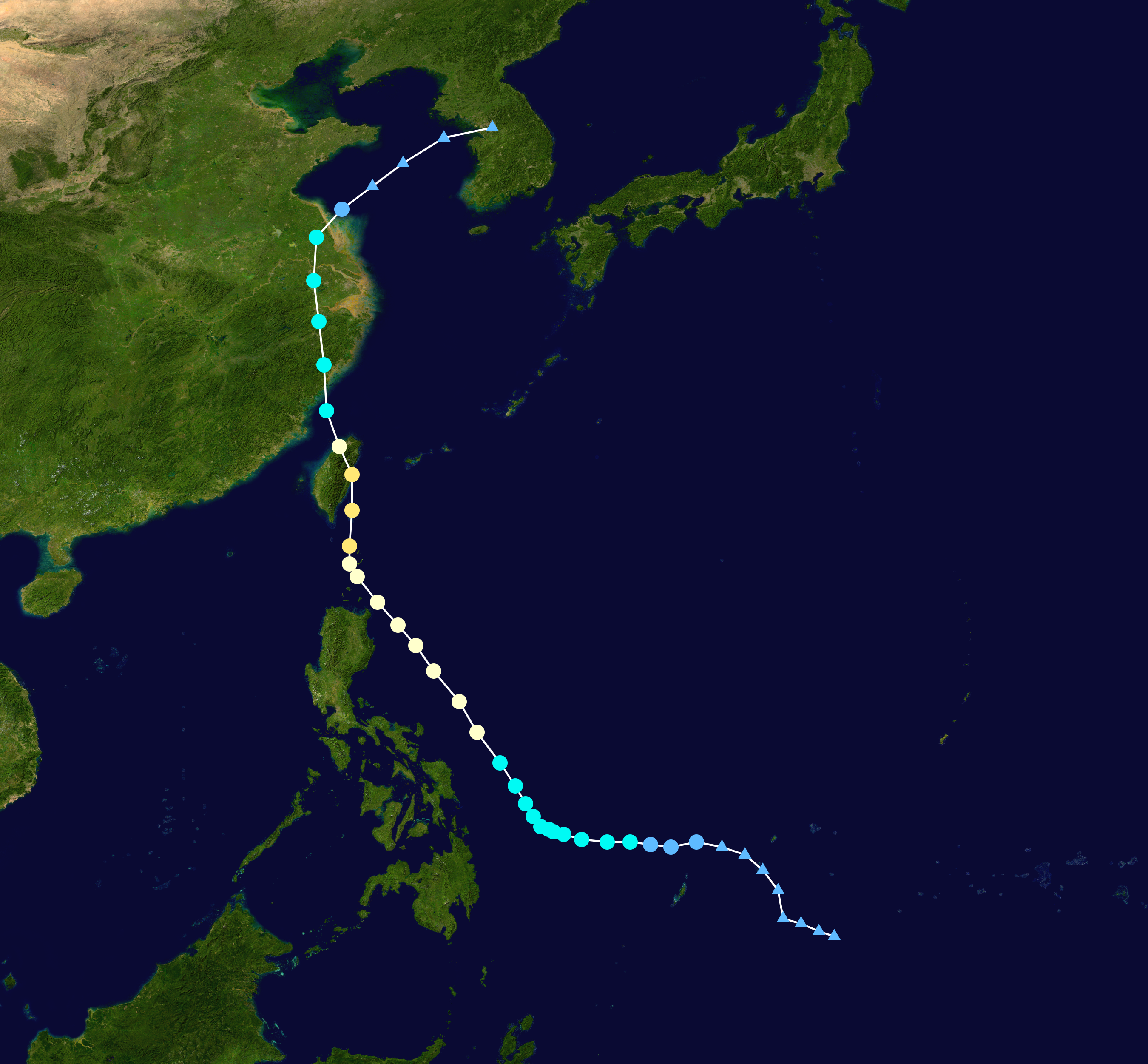
Map plotting the storm's track and intensity, according to the Saffir–Simpson scale Map key Saffir–Simpson scale Tropical depression (≤38 mph, ≤62 km/h) Tropical storm (39–73 mph, 63–118 km/h) Category 1 (74–95 mph, 119–153 km/h) Category 2 (96–110 mph, 154–177 km/h) Category 3 (111–129 mph, 178–208 km/h) Category 4 (130–156 mph, 209–251 km/h) Category 5 (≥157 mph, ≥252 km/h) Unknown Storm type Tropical cyclone Subtropical cyclone Extratropical cyclone, remnant low, tropical disturbance, or monsoon depression

Typhoon Ofelia, the third typhoon of the season and first of June, originated from the monsoon trough situated near the Caroline Islands. On the morning of June 15, the Joint Typhoon Warning Center (JTWC) began to track an area of persistent convection with winds of 30 km/h (20 mph). Eighteen hours later the Japan Meteorological Agency (JMA) upgraded the system into a tropical depression. (Note: The Japan Meteorological Agency is the official Regional Specialized Meteorological Center for the western Pacific Ocean.) Initially, the depression tracked westward along the periphery of a subtropical ridge and in an environment of high wind shear that slowed the rate of organization. Following an increase in convection and curved banding features and an improvement in outflow, the JTWC issued a tropical cyclone formation alert for the system on the morning of June 17. An increase in organization warranted the JTWC to classify the system as a tropical depression at noon that day. At the time, the depression was located roughly 390 km (240 mi) west of Yap. At 18:00 UTC on June 17, the JMA opted to upgrade the depression into a tropical storm. (Note: Wind estimates from the JMA and most other basins throughout the world are sustained over 10 minutes, while estimates from the United States-based Joint Typhoon Warning Center are sustained over 1 minute. 10-minute winds are about 1.14 times the amount of 1-minute winds.) Based on a Dvorak intensity estimate of T2.5/65 km/h (40 mph), the JTWC upgraded the depression into a tropical storm at 00:00 UTC on June 18.

Initially, the JTWC forecast Ofelia to move generally westward because many tropical cyclone forecast models showed a strong ridge to its north. Instead Ofelia slowed down and turned northwest on June 19 due to a surge in the southwesterly monsoon trough. Ofelia gradually deepened, and by 00:00 UTC on June 20, the JMA elected to upgrade Ofelia into a severe tropical storm. Following the development of a central dense overcast, Ofelia was upgraded into a typhoon by the JTWC late on June 20, even though satellite intensity estimates from the JMA suggested that Ofelia was a little weaker, with winds of 115 km/h (70 mph). Intensifying at a slower than climatological pace, Ofelia continued northwest as it rounded a subtropical ridge. On June 22, Ofelia began to turn north. At 18:00 UTC on June 22, the JMA upgraded Ofelia into a typhoon, while also estimating that the storm reached its maximum intensity of 120 km/h (75 mph) and a minimum central barometric pressure of 970 mbar (29 inHg). At this time, the JTWC reported that Ofelia reached its peak intensity of 170 km/h (105 mph); the basis for the estimate was a Dvorak classification of T5.0 and the appearance of an eye on weather satellite imagery.

The typhoon skirted past the northeastern tip of Luzon near peak intensity. It then turned northward, striking the east coast of Taiwan. Rapid weakening commenced due to land interaction, and at noon on June 23, the JMA lowered Ofelia to below typhoon strength, with the JTWC doing the same six hours later. Late on June 23, Ofelia struck the southern portion of Zhejiang. The storm then began to turn north and eventually recurve towards the Korean Peninsula. The storm tracked through the province of Jiangsu, and at 00:00 UTC on June 24 the JMA declared Ofelia an extratropical cyclone. According to the JTWC, however, this did not take place until 00:00 UTC on June 25 when the system moved offshore and merged with a frontal zone.

== Preparations, impact, and aftermath ==
=== Philippines ===
Despite remaining offshore northern Luzon, the storm's broad circulation enhanced the southwest monsoon that inundated much of the northern Philippines. Due to the impeding threat of Ofelia, authorities issued storm warnings for 13 provinces. Offshore, small craft advisories were issued. All storm warnings were discontinued on June 23 as the storm moved away.

The province of La Union was the hardest hit by the typhoon. There, 22 people were killed, including a 60-year-old man and a child that were killed via a landslide in Caba, where 90 homes were destroyed. Throughout the province damage totaled P20 million (US$833,000). (Note: All currencies are converted from Philippine pesos to United States Dollars using this with an exchange rate of the year 1990.) (Note: All damage totals are in 1990 values of their respective currencies.) In Pangasinan, west of La Union, two people were electrocuted. Three children died and six others suffered injuries in their homes due to heavy rains in Pasig. A 4-year-old girl died in a landslide in the mountain resort city of Baguio. Philippine Airlines cancelled five domestic flights to and from Manila while schools were closed in the capital and other affected areas. Storm surge toppled a seawall there and much of the city lost power. Offshore Manila, Provider and the Kootenay were stranded and necessitated rescue. Well to the south of Manila, lightning killed two people in Lanao del Sur. In all, 56 people were killed and 14 others were wounded in the country. Moreover, 270 homes were destroyed and over 2,000 were damaged. A total of 85,000 individuals were forced to flee their homes as a result of flooding.

In response to the storm, the Philippine Red Cross ordered its chapters to provide relief to affected areas. Furthermore, the agency provided 200 sacks of goods, 100 cartons of sardines, and 200 cartons of rice. A few days after Ofelia, Typhoon Percy passed through the country.

=== Taiwan ===
Taiwan, on the other hand, took a direct hit from Ofelia, with floodwater levels reaching 1 m (3.3 ft) in some places. According to media reports, the storm was the worst to impact eastern Taiwan in 30 years, dropping up to 46 cm (18 in) of rain in a 24-hour time span, although damage was slight elsewhere. Six people were killed, including five in drownings, and thirty were injured in Hualien City, which was hardest hit by the typhoon. There, a dike was destroyed, causing 500 individuals to be stranded. Much of the area lost electricity, water and telephone service and crop damage amounted to US$5 million. In nearby villages, four people were deemed missing and eight others were wounded. In the harbor of Hualien, a 10,900-metric-ton (12,000-short-ton) freighter, Cahaya, broke into three sections, though all 24 crewmen were unharmed. In addition, a 7,000-metric-ton (7,700-short-ton) freighter, Juliana, ran aground. All 28 sailors aboard were rescued, but three of them sustained minor injuries. Overall, more than 30 people required rescue during the course of the typhoon. All domestic flights were cancelled in Taiwan during the passage of the typhoon. Nationwide, over 200 houses were destroyed or damaged and about 8,500 ha (21,005 acres) of rice paddies and vegetables were flooded. Roads and highways were blocked by landslides and floods. Agricultural losses exceeded NT$2.55 billion (US$94.7 million). Seventeen people died and twenty-three were deemed missing in the ensuing flooding and mudslides.

=== China ===
After battering the Philippines and Taiwan, the typhoon dropped 100 mm (3.9 in) of precipitation in parts of central China. Across Wenzhou, 12 people were killed. There, about 21,000 ha (51,890 acres) of farmland and over 800 ha (1,975 acres) of shrimp ponds were flooded. A total of 215 homes received damage and 220 boats were swamped. Monetary damage was estimated at 205 million RMB (US$42.8 million). Elsewhere, an elderly woman was crushed under a collapsing wall in Shanghai. In Zhejiang, 1,696 boats were capsized, 3,700 homes were demolished, and 50 mi (80 km) of levees were destroyed. Throughout the province, 15 people were killed and 21 people were injured. In the neighboring province of Fujian, at least 15 people perished and 9,044 houses were demolished. About 91,000 ha (224,865 acres) of farmland were inundated and damage was estimated at 338 million RMB (US$94.7 million). Overall, 56 people were killed and 148 were injured in the country.

== See also ==
- Typhoon Irma (1985)
- Typhoon Matmo (2014)
